

116001–116100 

|-bgcolor=#E9E9E9
| 116001 ||  || — || November 20, 2003 || Socorro || LINEAR || HOF || align=right | 4.9 km || 
|-id=002 bgcolor=#fefefe
| 116002 ||  || — || November 18, 2003 || Kitt Peak || Spacewatch || — || align=right | 1.6 km || 
|-id=003 bgcolor=#E9E9E9
| 116003 ||  || — || November 19, 2003 || Kitt Peak || Spacewatch || — || align=right | 4.4 km || 
|-id=004 bgcolor=#d6d6d6
| 116004 ||  || — || November 19, 2003 || Socorro || LINEAR || VER || align=right | 6.2 km || 
|-id=005 bgcolor=#d6d6d6
| 116005 ||  || — || November 19, 2003 || Kitt Peak || Spacewatch || — || align=right | 5.0 km || 
|-id=006 bgcolor=#d6d6d6
| 116006 ||  || — || November 20, 2003 || Kitt Peak || Spacewatch || — || align=right | 7.0 km || 
|-id=007 bgcolor=#fefefe
| 116007 ||  || — || November 20, 2003 || Socorro || LINEAR || — || align=right | 2.0 km || 
|-id=008 bgcolor=#d6d6d6
| 116008 ||  || — || November 20, 2003 || Socorro || LINEAR || — || align=right | 7.0 km || 
|-id=009 bgcolor=#d6d6d6
| 116009 ||  || — || November 20, 2003 || Socorro || LINEAR || — || align=right | 4.8 km || 
|-id=010 bgcolor=#E9E9E9
| 116010 ||  || — || November 20, 2003 || Socorro || LINEAR || — || align=right | 4.1 km || 
|-id=011 bgcolor=#E9E9E9
| 116011 ||  || — || November 20, 2003 || Catalina || CSS || — || align=right | 2.1 km || 
|-id=012 bgcolor=#d6d6d6
| 116012 ||  || — || November 18, 2003 || Palomar || NEAT || — || align=right | 5.4 km || 
|-id=013 bgcolor=#E9E9E9
| 116013 ||  || — || November 19, 2003 || Palomar || NEAT || — || align=right | 4.9 km || 
|-id=014 bgcolor=#E9E9E9
| 116014 ||  || — || November 20, 2003 || Socorro || LINEAR || — || align=right | 3.1 km || 
|-id=015 bgcolor=#E9E9E9
| 116015 ||  || — || November 20, 2003 || Palomar || NEAT || EUN || align=right | 2.5 km || 
|-id=016 bgcolor=#E9E9E9
| 116016 ||  || — || November 20, 2003 || Socorro || LINEAR || KRM || align=right | 5.9 km || 
|-id=017 bgcolor=#d6d6d6
| 116017 ||  || — || November 19, 2003 || Palomar || NEAT || 615 || align=right | 3.9 km || 
|-id=018 bgcolor=#d6d6d6
| 116018 ||  || — || November 19, 2003 || Catalina || CSS || — || align=right | 4.5 km || 
|-id=019 bgcolor=#E9E9E9
| 116019 ||  || — || November 19, 2003 || Catalina || CSS || — || align=right | 4.4 km || 
|-id=020 bgcolor=#d6d6d6
| 116020 ||  || — || November 20, 2003 || Socorro || LINEAR || — || align=right | 6.5 km || 
|-id=021 bgcolor=#d6d6d6
| 116021 ||  || — || November 21, 2003 || Palomar || NEAT || URS || align=right | 7.4 km || 
|-id=022 bgcolor=#E9E9E9
| 116022 ||  || — || November 21, 2003 || Socorro || LINEAR || — || align=right | 6.2 km || 
|-id=023 bgcolor=#fefefe
| 116023 ||  || — || November 21, 2003 || Socorro || LINEAR || — || align=right | 1.7 km || 
|-id=024 bgcolor=#E9E9E9
| 116024 ||  || — || November 22, 2003 || Catalina || CSS || — || align=right | 3.9 km || 
|-id=025 bgcolor=#E9E9E9
| 116025 ||  || — || November 22, 2003 || Socorro || LINEAR || — || align=right | 3.7 km || 
|-id=026 bgcolor=#fefefe
| 116026 ||  || — || November 16, 2003 || Kitt Peak || Spacewatch || NYS || align=right | 1.5 km || 
|-id=027 bgcolor=#fefefe
| 116027 ||  || — || November 16, 2003 || Catalina || CSS || MAS || align=right | 1.1 km || 
|-id=028 bgcolor=#E9E9E9
| 116028 ||  || — || November 16, 2003 || Catalina || CSS || — || align=right | 4.3 km || 
|-id=029 bgcolor=#fefefe
| 116029 ||  || — || November 16, 2003 || Catalina || CSS || V || align=right data-sort-value="0.99" | 990 m || 
|-id=030 bgcolor=#E9E9E9
| 116030 ||  || — || November 18, 2003 || Kitt Peak || Spacewatch || — || align=right | 4.1 km || 
|-id=031 bgcolor=#d6d6d6
| 116031 ||  || — || November 18, 2003 || Kitt Peak || Spacewatch || — || align=right | 7.4 km || 
|-id=032 bgcolor=#E9E9E9
| 116032 ||  || — || November 19, 2003 || Anderson Mesa || LONEOS || — || align=right | 2.1 km || 
|-id=033 bgcolor=#fefefe
| 116033 ||  || — || November 19, 2003 || Anderson Mesa || LONEOS || V || align=right | 1.5 km || 
|-id=034 bgcolor=#fefefe
| 116034 ||  || — || November 19, 2003 || Anderson Mesa || LONEOS || MAS || align=right | 1.8 km || 
|-id=035 bgcolor=#d6d6d6
| 116035 ||  || — || November 19, 2003 || Anderson Mesa || LONEOS || — || align=right | 6.9 km || 
|-id=036 bgcolor=#d6d6d6
| 116036 ||  || — || November 19, 2003 || Anderson Mesa || LONEOS || ALA || align=right | 9.2 km || 
|-id=037 bgcolor=#E9E9E9
| 116037 ||  || — || November 20, 2003 || Socorro || LINEAR || EUN || align=right | 4.2 km || 
|-id=038 bgcolor=#fefefe
| 116038 ||  || — || November 20, 2003 || Socorro || LINEAR || V || align=right | 1.2 km || 
|-id=039 bgcolor=#E9E9E9
| 116039 ||  || — || November 20, 2003 || Socorro || LINEAR || AGN || align=right | 2.3 km || 
|-id=040 bgcolor=#d6d6d6
| 116040 ||  || — || November 21, 2003 || Palomar || NEAT || — || align=right | 9.9 km || 
|-id=041 bgcolor=#d6d6d6
| 116041 ||  || — || November 21, 2003 || Catalina || CSS || — || align=right | 4.3 km || 
|-id=042 bgcolor=#d6d6d6
| 116042 ||  || — || November 21, 2003 || Catalina || CSS || — || align=right | 7.3 km || 
|-id=043 bgcolor=#fefefe
| 116043 ||  || — || November 21, 2003 || Socorro || LINEAR || — || align=right | 1.3 km || 
|-id=044 bgcolor=#d6d6d6
| 116044 ||  || — || November 21, 2003 || Socorro || LINEAR || — || align=right | 4.3 km || 
|-id=045 bgcolor=#d6d6d6
| 116045 ||  || — || November 21, 2003 || Socorro || LINEAR || — || align=right | 7.9 km || 
|-id=046 bgcolor=#fefefe
| 116046 ||  || — || November 21, 2003 || Socorro || LINEAR || LCI || align=right | 2.8 km || 
|-id=047 bgcolor=#E9E9E9
| 116047 ||  || — || November 21, 2003 || Socorro || LINEAR || — || align=right | 4.2 km || 
|-id=048 bgcolor=#E9E9E9
| 116048 ||  || — || November 21, 2003 || Socorro || LINEAR || — || align=right | 4.7 km || 
|-id=049 bgcolor=#E9E9E9
| 116049 ||  || — || November 21, 2003 || Kitt Peak || Spacewatch || EUN || align=right | 2.5 km || 
|-id=050 bgcolor=#d6d6d6
| 116050 ||  || — || November 21, 2003 || Socorro || LINEAR || — || align=right | 7.1 km || 
|-id=051 bgcolor=#E9E9E9
| 116051 ||  || — || November 21, 2003 || Socorro || LINEAR || WAT || align=right | 4.2 km || 
|-id=052 bgcolor=#d6d6d6
| 116052 ||  || — || November 21, 2003 || Palomar || NEAT || TIR || align=right | 4.7 km || 
|-id=053 bgcolor=#E9E9E9
| 116053 ||  || — || November 22, 2003 || Socorro || LINEAR || HNS || align=right | 2.8 km || 
|-id=054 bgcolor=#E9E9E9
| 116054 ||  || — || November 23, 2003 || Socorro || LINEAR || HEN || align=right | 1.9 km || 
|-id=055 bgcolor=#E9E9E9
| 116055 ||  || — || November 23, 2003 || Catalina || CSS || MAR || align=right | 3.7 km || 
|-id=056 bgcolor=#E9E9E9
| 116056 ||  || — || November 23, 2003 || Catalina || CSS || EUN || align=right | 2.9 km || 
|-id=057 bgcolor=#E9E9E9
| 116057 ||  || — || November 24, 2003 || Catalina || CSS || BAR || align=right | 4.0 km || 
|-id=058 bgcolor=#fefefe
| 116058 ||  || — || November 20, 2003 || Socorro || LINEAR || V || align=right | 1.2 km || 
|-id=059 bgcolor=#d6d6d6
| 116059 ||  || — || November 20, 2003 || Socorro || LINEAR || — || align=right | 4.9 km || 
|-id=060 bgcolor=#E9E9E9
| 116060 ||  || — || November 20, 2003 || Socorro || LINEAR || — || align=right | 3.7 km || 
|-id=061 bgcolor=#fefefe
| 116061 ||  || — || November 20, 2003 || Socorro || LINEAR || — || align=right | 1.2 km || 
|-id=062 bgcolor=#d6d6d6
| 116062 ||  || — || November 20, 2003 || Socorro || LINEAR || HYG || align=right | 5.2 km || 
|-id=063 bgcolor=#d6d6d6
| 116063 ||  || — || November 20, 2003 || Socorro || LINEAR || — || align=right | 5.1 km || 
|-id=064 bgcolor=#E9E9E9
| 116064 ||  || — || November 20, 2003 || Socorro || LINEAR || — || align=right | 2.9 km || 
|-id=065 bgcolor=#E9E9E9
| 116065 ||  || — || November 20, 2003 || Socorro || LINEAR || NEM || align=right | 4.1 km || 
|-id=066 bgcolor=#d6d6d6
| 116066 ||  || — || November 20, 2003 || Socorro || LINEAR || EOS || align=right | 4.0 km || 
|-id=067 bgcolor=#fefefe
| 116067 ||  || — || November 20, 2003 || Socorro || LINEAR || FLO || align=right | 1.2 km || 
|-id=068 bgcolor=#d6d6d6
| 116068 ||  || — || November 20, 2003 || Socorro || LINEAR || — || align=right | 5.4 km || 
|-id=069 bgcolor=#d6d6d6
| 116069 ||  || — || November 20, 2003 || Socorro || LINEAR || EOS || align=right | 4.5 km || 
|-id=070 bgcolor=#E9E9E9
| 116070 ||  || — || November 20, 2003 || Socorro || LINEAR || MAR || align=right | 2.3 km || 
|-id=071 bgcolor=#fefefe
| 116071 ||  || — || November 20, 2003 || Socorro || LINEAR || — || align=right | 1.8 km || 
|-id=072 bgcolor=#fefefe
| 116072 ||  || — || November 20, 2003 || Socorro || LINEAR || — || align=right | 1.7 km || 
|-id=073 bgcolor=#fefefe
| 116073 ||  || — || November 20, 2003 || Socorro || LINEAR || — || align=right | 2.7 km || 
|-id=074 bgcolor=#d6d6d6
| 116074 ||  || — || November 20, 2003 || Socorro || LINEAR || — || align=right | 4.0 km || 
|-id=075 bgcolor=#fefefe
| 116075 ||  || — || November 20, 2003 || Socorro || LINEAR || — || align=right | 1.7 km || 
|-id=076 bgcolor=#E9E9E9
| 116076 ||  || — || November 20, 2003 || Socorro || LINEAR || — || align=right | 2.0 km || 
|-id=077 bgcolor=#E9E9E9
| 116077 ||  || — || November 20, 2003 || Socorro || LINEAR || — || align=right | 4.6 km || 
|-id=078 bgcolor=#E9E9E9
| 116078 ||  || — || November 20, 2003 || Socorro || LINEAR || — || align=right | 2.0 km || 
|-id=079 bgcolor=#E9E9E9
| 116079 ||  || — || November 20, 2003 || Socorro || LINEAR || — || align=right | 3.2 km || 
|-id=080 bgcolor=#d6d6d6
| 116080 ||  || — || November 20, 2003 || Socorro || LINEAR || — || align=right | 6.2 km || 
|-id=081 bgcolor=#E9E9E9
| 116081 ||  || — || November 20, 2003 || Socorro || LINEAR || — || align=right | 2.9 km || 
|-id=082 bgcolor=#E9E9E9
| 116082 ||  || — || November 20, 2003 || Socorro || LINEAR || — || align=right | 3.0 km || 
|-id=083 bgcolor=#E9E9E9
| 116083 ||  || — || November 20, 2003 || Socorro || LINEAR || — || align=right | 4.4 km || 
|-id=084 bgcolor=#E9E9E9
| 116084 ||  || — || November 20, 2003 || Socorro || LINEAR || — || align=right | 2.1 km || 
|-id=085 bgcolor=#E9E9E9
| 116085 ||  || — || November 20, 2003 || Socorro || LINEAR || — || align=right | 3.4 km || 
|-id=086 bgcolor=#d6d6d6
| 116086 ||  || — || November 20, 2003 || Socorro || LINEAR || — || align=right | 4.1 km || 
|-id=087 bgcolor=#d6d6d6
| 116087 ||  || — || November 20, 2003 || Socorro || LINEAR || EUP || align=right | 8.9 km || 
|-id=088 bgcolor=#E9E9E9
| 116088 ||  || — || November 20, 2003 || Socorro || LINEAR || — || align=right | 2.3 km || 
|-id=089 bgcolor=#E9E9E9
| 116089 ||  || — || November 20, 2003 || Socorro || LINEAR || ADE || align=right | 6.9 km || 
|-id=090 bgcolor=#d6d6d6
| 116090 ||  || — || November 20, 2003 || Socorro || LINEAR || — || align=right | 7.9 km || 
|-id=091 bgcolor=#E9E9E9
| 116091 ||  || — || November 20, 2003 || Socorro || LINEAR || — || align=right | 5.4 km || 
|-id=092 bgcolor=#E9E9E9
| 116092 ||  || — || November 20, 2003 || Socorro || LINEAR || — || align=right | 2.6 km || 
|-id=093 bgcolor=#d6d6d6
| 116093 ||  || — || November 20, 2003 || Socorro || LINEAR || — || align=right | 3.1 km || 
|-id=094 bgcolor=#d6d6d6
| 116094 ||  || — || November 20, 2003 || Socorro || LINEAR || — || align=right | 6.9 km || 
|-id=095 bgcolor=#E9E9E9
| 116095 ||  || — || November 20, 2003 || Socorro || LINEAR || MIS || align=right | 6.3 km || 
|-id=096 bgcolor=#d6d6d6
| 116096 ||  || — || November 20, 2003 || Socorro || LINEAR || HYG || align=right | 7.0 km || 
|-id=097 bgcolor=#E9E9E9
| 116097 ||  || — || November 20, 2003 || Socorro || LINEAR || — || align=right | 3.8 km || 
|-id=098 bgcolor=#d6d6d6
| 116098 ||  || — || November 20, 2003 || Socorro || LINEAR || ALA || align=right | 7.0 km || 
|-id=099 bgcolor=#d6d6d6
| 116099 ||  || — || November 20, 2003 || Socorro || LINEAR || — || align=right | 4.2 km || 
|-id=100 bgcolor=#d6d6d6
| 116100 ||  || — || November 20, 2003 || Socorro || LINEAR || — || align=right | 6.7 km || 
|}

116101–116200 

|-bgcolor=#fefefe
| 116101 ||  || — || November 21, 2003 || Palomar || NEAT || — || align=right | 1.2 km || 
|-id=102 bgcolor=#fefefe
| 116102 ||  || — || November 19, 2003 || Kitt Peak || Spacewatch || FLO || align=right | 1.1 km || 
|-id=103 bgcolor=#E9E9E9
| 116103 ||  || — || November 21, 2003 || Socorro || LINEAR || — || align=right | 2.4 km || 
|-id=104 bgcolor=#E9E9E9
| 116104 ||  || — || November 21, 2003 || Socorro || LINEAR || HEN || align=right | 1.8 km || 
|-id=105 bgcolor=#fefefe
| 116105 ||  || — || November 21, 2003 || Socorro || LINEAR || FLO || align=right | 1.3 km || 
|-id=106 bgcolor=#fefefe
| 116106 ||  || — || November 21, 2003 || Socorro || LINEAR || V || align=right | 1.4 km || 
|-id=107 bgcolor=#fefefe
| 116107 ||  || — || November 21, 2003 || Socorro || LINEAR || FLO || align=right | 1.2 km || 
|-id=108 bgcolor=#E9E9E9
| 116108 ||  || — || November 21, 2003 || Socorro || LINEAR || — || align=right | 5.5 km || 
|-id=109 bgcolor=#fefefe
| 116109 ||  || — || November 21, 2003 || Socorro || LINEAR || — || align=right | 1.3 km || 
|-id=110 bgcolor=#fefefe
| 116110 ||  || — || November 21, 2003 || Socorro || LINEAR || FLO || align=right | 1.4 km || 
|-id=111 bgcolor=#d6d6d6
| 116111 ||  || — || November 21, 2003 || Socorro || LINEAR || — || align=right | 6.7 km || 
|-id=112 bgcolor=#E9E9E9
| 116112 ||  || — || November 21, 2003 || Socorro || LINEAR || — || align=right | 4.9 km || 
|-id=113 bgcolor=#E9E9E9
| 116113 ||  || — || November 21, 2003 || Socorro || LINEAR || — || align=right | 4.7 km || 
|-id=114 bgcolor=#E9E9E9
| 116114 ||  || — || November 21, 2003 || Socorro || LINEAR || AGN || align=right | 2.4 km || 
|-id=115 bgcolor=#d6d6d6
| 116115 ||  || — || November 21, 2003 || Socorro || LINEAR || ALA || align=right | 8.8 km || 
|-id=116 bgcolor=#d6d6d6
| 116116 ||  || — || November 21, 2003 || Socorro || LINEAR || EOS || align=right | 5.4 km || 
|-id=117 bgcolor=#d6d6d6
| 116117 ||  || — || November 21, 2003 || Socorro || LINEAR || EOS || align=right | 4.7 km || 
|-id=118 bgcolor=#d6d6d6
| 116118 ||  || — || November 21, 2003 || Socorro || LINEAR || THM || align=right | 4.6 km || 
|-id=119 bgcolor=#fefefe
| 116119 ||  || — || November 21, 2003 || Socorro || LINEAR || V || align=right | 1.3 km || 
|-id=120 bgcolor=#E9E9E9
| 116120 ||  || — || November 21, 2003 || Socorro || LINEAR || — || align=right | 2.2 km || 
|-id=121 bgcolor=#E9E9E9
| 116121 ||  || — || November 21, 2003 || Socorro || LINEAR || — || align=right | 3.1 km || 
|-id=122 bgcolor=#fefefe
| 116122 ||  || — || November 21, 2003 || Socorro || LINEAR || NYS || align=right | 1.4 km || 
|-id=123 bgcolor=#E9E9E9
| 116123 ||  || — || November 21, 2003 || Socorro || LINEAR || — || align=right | 1.9 km || 
|-id=124 bgcolor=#d6d6d6
| 116124 ||  || — || November 21, 2003 || Socorro || LINEAR || — || align=right | 5.1 km || 
|-id=125 bgcolor=#E9E9E9
| 116125 ||  || — || November 21, 2003 || Socorro || LINEAR || EUN || align=right | 3.1 km || 
|-id=126 bgcolor=#E9E9E9
| 116126 ||  || — || November 21, 2003 || Socorro || LINEAR || — || align=right | 2.1 km || 
|-id=127 bgcolor=#fefefe
| 116127 ||  || — || November 21, 2003 || Socorro || LINEAR || — || align=right | 1.3 km || 
|-id=128 bgcolor=#d6d6d6
| 116128 ||  || — || November 21, 2003 || Socorro || LINEAR || — || align=right | 4.0 km || 
|-id=129 bgcolor=#E9E9E9
| 116129 ||  || — || November 21, 2003 || Socorro || LINEAR || — || align=right | 2.5 km || 
|-id=130 bgcolor=#d6d6d6
| 116130 ||  || — || November 21, 2003 || Socorro || LINEAR || NAE || align=right | 7.0 km || 
|-id=131 bgcolor=#E9E9E9
| 116131 ||  || — || November 21, 2003 || Socorro || LINEAR || ADE || align=right | 6.6 km || 
|-id=132 bgcolor=#d6d6d6
| 116132 ||  || — || November 21, 2003 || Socorro || LINEAR || — || align=right | 7.0 km || 
|-id=133 bgcolor=#fefefe
| 116133 ||  || — || November 21, 2003 || Socorro || LINEAR || PHO || align=right | 2.5 km || 
|-id=134 bgcolor=#C2FFFF
| 116134 ||  || — || November 23, 2003 || Socorro || LINEAR || L5 || align=right | 15 km || 
|-id=135 bgcolor=#fefefe
| 116135 ||  || — || November 21, 2003 || Socorro || LINEAR || MAS || align=right | 1.1 km || 
|-id=136 bgcolor=#fefefe
| 116136 ||  || — || November 21, 2003 || Socorro || LINEAR || — || align=right | 1.4 km || 
|-id=137 bgcolor=#d6d6d6
| 116137 ||  || — || November 21, 2003 || Socorro || LINEAR || — || align=right | 6.4 km || 
|-id=138 bgcolor=#E9E9E9
| 116138 ||  || — || November 21, 2003 || Socorro || LINEAR || AST || align=right | 3.9 km || 
|-id=139 bgcolor=#d6d6d6
| 116139 ||  || — || November 21, 2003 || Socorro || LINEAR || TIR || align=right | 3.6 km || 
|-id=140 bgcolor=#d6d6d6
| 116140 ||  || — || November 23, 2003 || Catalina || CSS || — || align=right | 7.4 km || 
|-id=141 bgcolor=#fefefe
| 116141 ||  || — || November 24, 2003 || Socorro || LINEAR || V || align=right | 1.1 km || 
|-id=142 bgcolor=#fefefe
| 116142 ||  || — || November 24, 2003 || Anderson Mesa || LONEOS || V || align=right | 1.2 km || 
|-id=143 bgcolor=#E9E9E9
| 116143 ||  || — || November 25, 2003 || Kingsnake || J. V. McClusky || — || align=right | 2.5 km || 
|-id=144 bgcolor=#d6d6d6
| 116144 ||  || — || November 26, 2003 || Anderson Mesa || LONEOS || — || align=right | 7.7 km || 
|-id=145 bgcolor=#d6d6d6
| 116145 ||  || — || November 29, 2003 || Kitt Peak || Spacewatch || — || align=right | 5.4 km || 
|-id=146 bgcolor=#E9E9E9
| 116146 ||  || — || November 29, 2003 || Socorro || LINEAR || — || align=right | 3.7 km || 
|-id=147 bgcolor=#fefefe
| 116147 ||  || — || November 18, 2003 || Kitt Peak || Spacewatch || — || align=right | 1.2 km || 
|-id=148 bgcolor=#fefefe
| 116148 ||  || — || November 19, 2003 || Anderson Mesa || LONEOS || — || align=right | 1.5 km || 
|-id=149 bgcolor=#E9E9E9
| 116149 ||  || — || November 29, 2003 || Needville || Needville Obs. || — || align=right | 1.8 km || 
|-id=150 bgcolor=#E9E9E9
| 116150 ||  || — || November 30, 2003 || Socorro || LINEAR || EUN || align=right | 2.6 km || 
|-id=151 bgcolor=#E9E9E9
| 116151 ||  || — || November 30, 2003 || Kitt Peak || Spacewatch || AGN || align=right | 1.9 km || 
|-id=152 bgcolor=#d6d6d6
| 116152 ||  || — || November 30, 2003 || Kitt Peak || Spacewatch || — || align=right | 8.7 km || 
|-id=153 bgcolor=#d6d6d6
| 116153 ||  || — || November 18, 2003 || Anderson Mesa || LONEOS || — || align=right | 6.0 km || 
|-id=154 bgcolor=#d6d6d6
| 116154 ||  || — || November 19, 2003 || Palomar || NEAT || — || align=right | 8.5 km || 
|-id=155 bgcolor=#fefefe
| 116155 ||  || — || November 19, 2003 || Palomar || NEAT || — || align=right | 1.9 km || 
|-id=156 bgcolor=#fefefe
| 116156 ||  || — || November 21, 2003 || Catalina || CSS || — || align=right | 3.2 km || 
|-id=157 bgcolor=#E9E9E9
| 116157 ||  || — || November 21, 2003 || Palomar || NEAT || — || align=right | 2.8 km || 
|-id=158 bgcolor=#d6d6d6
| 116158 ||  || — || November 29, 2003 || Socorro || LINEAR || — || align=right | 3.5 km || 
|-id=159 bgcolor=#E9E9E9
| 116159 ||  || — || November 29, 2003 || Socorro || LINEAR || MAR || align=right | 2.1 km || 
|-id=160 bgcolor=#E9E9E9
| 116160 ||  || — || November 19, 2003 || Socorro || LINEAR || — || align=right | 4.0 km || 
|-id=161 bgcolor=#fefefe
| 116161 ||  || — || November 19, 2003 || Kitt Peak || Spacewatch || NYS || align=right | 1.0 km || 
|-id=162 bgcolor=#E9E9E9
| 116162 Sidneygutierrez ||  ||  || November 20, 2003 || Kitt Peak || M. W. Buie || HEN || align=right | 2.4 km || 
|-id=163 bgcolor=#E9E9E9
| 116163 ||  || — || November 21, 2003 || Socorro || LINEAR || — || align=right | 3.1 km || 
|-id=164 bgcolor=#d6d6d6
| 116164 ||  || — || November 24, 2003 || Socorro || LINEAR || — || align=right | 3.7 km || 
|-id=165 bgcolor=#E9E9E9
| 116165 ||  || — || November 20, 2003 || Palomar || NEAT || — || align=right | 2.4 km || 
|-id=166 bgcolor=#d6d6d6
| 116166 Andrémaeder || 2003 XJ ||  || December 3, 2003 || La Silla || R. Behrend, R. Gauderon || — || align=right | 4.7 km || 
|-id=167 bgcolor=#E9E9E9
| 116167 ||  || — || December 1, 2003 || Socorro || LINEAR || DOR || align=right | 5.0 km || 
|-id=168 bgcolor=#fefefe
| 116168 ||  || — || December 1, 2003 || Kitt Peak || Spacewatch || — || align=right | 1.5 km || 
|-id=169 bgcolor=#d6d6d6
| 116169 ||  || — || December 1, 2003 || Socorro || LINEAR || — || align=right | 6.0 km || 
|-id=170 bgcolor=#d6d6d6
| 116170 ||  || — || December 1, 2003 || Socorro || LINEAR || — || align=right | 5.8 km || 
|-id=171 bgcolor=#E9E9E9
| 116171 ||  || — || December 1, 2003 || Socorro || LINEAR || — || align=right | 2.2 km || 
|-id=172 bgcolor=#d6d6d6
| 116172 ||  || — || December 1, 2003 || Socorro || LINEAR || 7:4 || align=right | 7.7 km || 
|-id=173 bgcolor=#d6d6d6
| 116173 ||  || — || December 1, 2003 || Socorro || LINEAR || — || align=right | 3.8 km || 
|-id=174 bgcolor=#d6d6d6
| 116174 ||  || — || December 1, 2003 || Socorro || LINEAR || — || align=right | 4.0 km || 
|-id=175 bgcolor=#E9E9E9
| 116175 ||  || — || December 1, 2003 || Socorro || LINEAR || — || align=right | 2.6 km || 
|-id=176 bgcolor=#fefefe
| 116176 ||  || — || December 1, 2003 || Socorro || LINEAR || — || align=right | 1.6 km || 
|-id=177 bgcolor=#d6d6d6
| 116177 ||  || — || December 1, 2003 || Socorro || LINEAR || — || align=right | 6.3 km || 
|-id=178 bgcolor=#E9E9E9
| 116178 ||  || — || December 1, 2003 || Socorro || LINEAR || — || align=right | 5.1 km || 
|-id=179 bgcolor=#E9E9E9
| 116179 ||  || — || December 1, 2003 || Socorro || LINEAR || EUN || align=right | 2.2 km || 
|-id=180 bgcolor=#E9E9E9
| 116180 ||  || — || December 1, 2003 || Kitt Peak || Spacewatch || — || align=right | 2.4 km || 
|-id=181 bgcolor=#d6d6d6
| 116181 ||  || — || December 1, 2003 || Catalina || CSS || — || align=right | 4.5 km || 
|-id=182 bgcolor=#d6d6d6
| 116182 ||  || — || December 3, 2003 || Anderson Mesa || LONEOS || — || align=right | 5.3 km || 
|-id=183 bgcolor=#d6d6d6
| 116183 ||  || — || December 3, 2003 || Socorro || LINEAR || — || align=right | 3.8 km || 
|-id=184 bgcolor=#d6d6d6
| 116184 ||  || — || December 3, 2003 || Socorro || LINEAR || — || align=right | 3.0 km || 
|-id=185 bgcolor=#E9E9E9
| 116185 ||  || — || December 3, 2003 || Socorro || LINEAR || EUN || align=right | 2.4 km || 
|-id=186 bgcolor=#E9E9E9
| 116186 ||  || — || December 3, 2003 || Socorro || LINEAR || — || align=right | 4.8 km || 
|-id=187 bgcolor=#E9E9E9
| 116187 ||  || — || December 4, 2003 || Socorro || LINEAR || — || align=right | 2.1 km || 
|-id=188 bgcolor=#d6d6d6
| 116188 ||  || — || December 4, 2003 || Socorro || LINEAR || — || align=right | 6.5 km || 
|-id=189 bgcolor=#E9E9E9
| 116189 ||  || — || December 4, 2003 || Socorro || LINEAR || — || align=right | 2.6 km || 
|-id=190 bgcolor=#E9E9E9
| 116190 ||  || — || December 4, 2003 || Socorro || LINEAR || — || align=right | 2.9 km || 
|-id=191 bgcolor=#E9E9E9
| 116191 ||  || — || December 4, 2003 || Socorro || LINEAR || — || align=right | 3.1 km || 
|-id=192 bgcolor=#d6d6d6
| 116192 ||  || — || December 10, 2003 || Nogales || Tenagra II Obs. || — || align=right | 5.0 km || 
|-id=193 bgcolor=#d6d6d6
| 116193 ||  || — || December 12, 2003 || Palomar || NEAT || — || align=right | 3.4 km || 
|-id=194 bgcolor=#d6d6d6
| 116194 ||  || — || December 13, 2003 || Socorro || LINEAR || EUP || align=right | 8.4 km || 
|-id=195 bgcolor=#E9E9E9
| 116195 ||  || — || December 13, 2003 || Socorro || LINEAR || — || align=right | 6.4 km || 
|-id=196 bgcolor=#d6d6d6
| 116196 ||  || — || December 14, 2003 || Kitt Peak || Spacewatch || — || align=right | 4.3 km || 
|-id=197 bgcolor=#d6d6d6
| 116197 ||  || — || December 15, 2003 || Socorro || LINEAR || — || align=right | 6.6 km || 
|-id=198 bgcolor=#E9E9E9
| 116198 ||  || — || December 15, 2003 || Socorro || LINEAR || HNS || align=right | 3.1 km || 
|-id=199 bgcolor=#d6d6d6
| 116199 ||  || — || December 1, 2003 || Socorro || LINEAR || — || align=right | 7.2 km || 
|-id=200 bgcolor=#fefefe
| 116200 ||  || — || December 15, 2003 || Socorro || LINEAR || PHO || align=right | 3.3 km || 
|}

116201–116300 

|-bgcolor=#E9E9E9
| 116201 ||  || — || December 3, 2003 || Anderson Mesa || LONEOS || — || align=right | 4.4 km || 
|-id=202 bgcolor=#E9E9E9
| 116202 ||  || — || December 14, 2003 || Palomar || NEAT || — || align=right | 3.2 km || 
|-id=203 bgcolor=#fefefe
| 116203 ||  || — || December 14, 2003 || Palomar || NEAT || NYS || align=right | 1.0 km || 
|-id=204 bgcolor=#d6d6d6
| 116204 ||  || — || December 12, 2003 || Palomar || NEAT || — || align=right | 4.4 km || 
|-id=205 bgcolor=#E9E9E9
| 116205 ||  || — || December 5, 2003 || Catalina || CSS || — || align=right | 2.1 km || 
|-id=206 bgcolor=#d6d6d6
| 116206 ||  || — || December 1, 2003 || Kitt Peak || Spacewatch || THM || align=right | 5.0 km || 
|-id=207 bgcolor=#E9E9E9
| 116207 ||  || — || December 3, 2003 || Socorro || LINEAR || MAR || align=right | 3.2 km || 
|-id=208 bgcolor=#E9E9E9
| 116208 ||  || — || December 3, 2003 || Socorro || LINEAR || — || align=right | 3.6 km || 
|-id=209 bgcolor=#d6d6d6
| 116209 ||  || — || December 3, 2003 || Socorro || LINEAR || KOR || align=right | 2.6 km || 
|-id=210 bgcolor=#E9E9E9
| 116210 ||  || — || December 3, 2003 || Socorro || LINEAR || — || align=right | 3.8 km || 
|-id=211 bgcolor=#d6d6d6
| 116211 ||  || — || December 3, 2003 || Socorro || LINEAR || EOS || align=right | 3.5 km || 
|-id=212 bgcolor=#E9E9E9
| 116212 ||  || — || December 3, 2003 || Socorro || LINEAR || — || align=right | 4.0 km || 
|-id=213 bgcolor=#d6d6d6
| 116213 ||  || — || December 3, 2003 || Socorro || LINEAR || TEL || align=right | 2.5 km || 
|-id=214 bgcolor=#d6d6d6
| 116214 ||  || — || December 3, 2003 || Socorro || LINEAR || — || align=right | 4.1 km || 
|-id=215 bgcolor=#E9E9E9
| 116215 ||  || — || December 13, 2003 || Palomar || NEAT || MAR || align=right | 2.1 km || 
|-id=216 bgcolor=#fefefe
| 116216 ||  || — || December 14, 2003 || Kitt Peak || Spacewatch || FLO || align=right | 1.1 km || 
|-id=217 bgcolor=#d6d6d6
| 116217 ||  || — || December 14, 2003 || Kitt Peak || Spacewatch || — || align=right | 6.2 km || 
|-id=218 bgcolor=#E9E9E9
| 116218 ||  || — || December 15, 2003 || Socorro || LINEAR || — || align=right | 4.0 km || 
|-id=219 bgcolor=#d6d6d6
| 116219 || 2003 YH || — || December 16, 2003 || Socorro || LINEAR || EUP || align=right | 6.7 km || 
|-id=220 bgcolor=#fefefe
| 116220 ||  || — || December 17, 2003 || Kitt Peak || Spacewatch || — || align=right | 1.3 km || 
|-id=221 bgcolor=#fefefe
| 116221 ||  || — || December 19, 2003 || Socorro || LINEAR || H || align=right | 2.2 km || 
|-id=222 bgcolor=#E9E9E9
| 116222 ||  || — || December 16, 2003 || Catalina || CSS || — || align=right | 2.0 km || 
|-id=223 bgcolor=#d6d6d6
| 116223 ||  || — || December 16, 2003 || Catalina || CSS || EOS || align=right | 3.4 km || 
|-id=224 bgcolor=#fefefe
| 116224 ||  || — || December 16, 2003 || Kitt Peak || Spacewatch || — || align=right | 1.7 km || 
|-id=225 bgcolor=#fefefe
| 116225 ||  || — || December 16, 2003 || Kitt Peak || Spacewatch || — || align=right | 2.0 km || 
|-id=226 bgcolor=#d6d6d6
| 116226 ||  || — || December 16, 2003 || Kitt Peak || Spacewatch || EOS || align=right | 7.0 km || 
|-id=227 bgcolor=#d6d6d6
| 116227 ||  || — || December 16, 2003 || Catalina || CSS || — || align=right | 5.7 km || 
|-id=228 bgcolor=#d6d6d6
| 116228 ||  || — || December 16, 2003 || Catalina || CSS || HYG || align=right | 6.4 km || 
|-id=229 bgcolor=#E9E9E9
| 116229 ||  || — || December 16, 2003 || Kitt Peak || Spacewatch || MAR || align=right | 2.2 km || 
|-id=230 bgcolor=#E9E9E9
| 116230 ||  || — || December 16, 2003 || Catalina || CSS || — || align=right | 1.7 km || 
|-id=231 bgcolor=#d6d6d6
| 116231 ||  || — || December 16, 2003 || Catalina || CSS || EOS || align=right | 4.0 km || 
|-id=232 bgcolor=#E9E9E9
| 116232 ||  || — || December 16, 2003 || Kitt Peak || Spacewatch || WIT || align=right | 1.8 km || 
|-id=233 bgcolor=#E9E9E9
| 116233 ||  || — || December 16, 2003 || Anderson Mesa || LONEOS || — || align=right | 3.0 km || 
|-id=234 bgcolor=#E9E9E9
| 116234 ||  || — || December 17, 2003 || Anderson Mesa || LONEOS || — || align=right | 2.0 km || 
|-id=235 bgcolor=#fefefe
| 116235 ||  || — || December 19, 2003 || Socorro || LINEAR || — || align=right | 1.7 km || 
|-id=236 bgcolor=#d6d6d6
| 116236 ||  || — || December 17, 2003 || Socorro || LINEAR || — || align=right | 6.5 km || 
|-id=237 bgcolor=#d6d6d6
| 116237 ||  || — || December 17, 2003 || Socorro || LINEAR || — || align=right | 3.3 km || 
|-id=238 bgcolor=#C2FFFF
| 116238 ||  || — || December 17, 2003 || Socorro || LINEAR || L5 || align=right | 17 km || 
|-id=239 bgcolor=#d6d6d6
| 116239 ||  || — || December 17, 2003 || Anderson Mesa || LONEOS || EOS || align=right | 3.2 km || 
|-id=240 bgcolor=#fefefe
| 116240 ||  || — || December 17, 2003 || Catalina || CSS || V || align=right | 1.4 km || 
|-id=241 bgcolor=#d6d6d6
| 116241 ||  || — || December 17, 2003 || Socorro || LINEAR || — || align=right | 3.1 km || 
|-id=242 bgcolor=#fefefe
| 116242 ||  || — || December 17, 2003 || Socorro || LINEAR || — || align=right | 1.7 km || 
|-id=243 bgcolor=#d6d6d6
| 116243 ||  || — || December 17, 2003 || Socorro || LINEAR || — || align=right | 6.7 km || 
|-id=244 bgcolor=#fefefe
| 116244 ||  || — || December 17, 2003 || Anderson Mesa || LONEOS || FLO || align=right | 1.1 km || 
|-id=245 bgcolor=#d6d6d6
| 116245 ||  || — || December 17, 2003 || Anderson Mesa || LONEOS || — || align=right | 6.0 km || 
|-id=246 bgcolor=#d6d6d6
| 116246 ||  || — || December 17, 2003 || Anderson Mesa || LONEOS || — || align=right | 6.9 km || 
|-id=247 bgcolor=#fefefe
| 116247 ||  || — || December 17, 2003 || Kitt Peak || Spacewatch || V || align=right | 1.3 km || 
|-id=248 bgcolor=#E9E9E9
| 116248 ||  || — || December 17, 2003 || Kitt Peak || Spacewatch || — || align=right | 2.0 km || 
|-id=249 bgcolor=#E9E9E9
| 116249 ||  || — || December 17, 2003 || Kitt Peak || Spacewatch || — || align=right | 1.4 km || 
|-id=250 bgcolor=#E9E9E9
| 116250 ||  || — || December 18, 2003 || Socorro || LINEAR || — || align=right | 2.6 km || 
|-id=251 bgcolor=#d6d6d6
| 116251 ||  || — || December 17, 2003 || Socorro || LINEAR || — || align=right | 6.2 km || 
|-id=252 bgcolor=#E9E9E9
| 116252 ||  || — || December 17, 2003 || Kitt Peak || Spacewatch || — || align=right | 2.8 km || 
|-id=253 bgcolor=#d6d6d6
| 116253 ||  || — || December 18, 2003 || Socorro || LINEAR || — || align=right | 5.0 km || 
|-id=254 bgcolor=#fefefe
| 116254 ||  || — || December 18, 2003 || Kitt Peak || Spacewatch || PHO || align=right | 2.0 km || 
|-id=255 bgcolor=#d6d6d6
| 116255 ||  || — || December 16, 2003 || Anderson Mesa || LONEOS || — || align=right | 2.8 km || 
|-id=256 bgcolor=#d6d6d6
| 116256 ||  || — || December 16, 2003 || Črni Vrh || Črni Vrh || — || align=right | 4.6 km || 
|-id=257 bgcolor=#d6d6d6
| 116257 ||  || — || December 17, 2003 || Palomar || NEAT || EMA || align=right | 6.1 km || 
|-id=258 bgcolor=#fefefe
| 116258 ||  || — || December 17, 2003 || Palomar || NEAT || FLO || align=right | 2.5 km || 
|-id=259 bgcolor=#fefefe
| 116259 ||  || — || December 18, 2003 || Kitt Peak || Spacewatch || — || align=right | 1.4 km || 
|-id=260 bgcolor=#E9E9E9
| 116260 ||  || — || December 18, 2003 || Kitt Peak || Spacewatch || — || align=right | 1.5 km || 
|-id=261 bgcolor=#E9E9E9
| 116261 ||  || — || December 18, 2003 || Socorro || LINEAR || — || align=right | 4.3 km || 
|-id=262 bgcolor=#d6d6d6
| 116262 ||  || — || December 18, 2003 || Socorro || LINEAR || — || align=right | 3.1 km || 
|-id=263 bgcolor=#E9E9E9
| 116263 ||  || — || December 22, 2003 || Palomar || NEAT || GAL || align=right | 2.6 km || 
|-id=264 bgcolor=#d6d6d6
| 116264 ||  || — || December 16, 2003 || Kitt Peak || Spacewatch || — || align=right | 5.5 km || 
|-id=265 bgcolor=#E9E9E9
| 116265 ||  || — || December 16, 2003 || Catalina || CSS || WIT || align=right | 1.8 km || 
|-id=266 bgcolor=#fefefe
| 116266 ||  || — || December 16, 2003 || Kitt Peak || Spacewatch || V || align=right | 1.3 km || 
|-id=267 bgcolor=#E9E9E9
| 116267 ||  || — || December 17, 2003 || Anderson Mesa || LONEOS || WIT || align=right | 2.1 km || 
|-id=268 bgcolor=#fefefe
| 116268 ||  || — || December 18, 2003 || Socorro || LINEAR || V || align=right | 1.2 km || 
|-id=269 bgcolor=#E9E9E9
| 116269 ||  || — || December 18, 2003 || Haleakala || NEAT || — || align=right | 6.6 km || 
|-id=270 bgcolor=#fefefe
| 116270 ||  || — || December 19, 2003 || Socorro || LINEAR || — || align=right | 1.7 km || 
|-id=271 bgcolor=#d6d6d6
| 116271 ||  || — || December 19, 2003 || Socorro || LINEAR || CHA || align=right | 4.7 km || 
|-id=272 bgcolor=#E9E9E9
| 116272 ||  || — || December 19, 2003 || Kitt Peak || Spacewatch || — || align=right | 2.8 km || 
|-id=273 bgcolor=#d6d6d6
| 116273 ||  || — || December 19, 2003 || Kitt Peak || Spacewatch || — || align=right | 3.8 km || 
|-id=274 bgcolor=#E9E9E9
| 116274 ||  || — || December 19, 2003 || Kitt Peak || Spacewatch || — || align=right | 5.7 km || 
|-id=275 bgcolor=#E9E9E9
| 116275 ||  || — || December 19, 2003 || Socorro || LINEAR || — || align=right | 2.8 km || 
|-id=276 bgcolor=#E9E9E9
| 116276 ||  || — || December 19, 2003 || Kitt Peak || Spacewatch || HEN || align=right | 2.2 km || 
|-id=277 bgcolor=#E9E9E9
| 116277 ||  || — || December 17, 2003 || Anderson Mesa || LONEOS || AGN || align=right | 2.4 km || 
|-id=278 bgcolor=#d6d6d6
| 116278 ||  || — || December 17, 2003 || Socorro || LINEAR || — || align=right | 7.1 km || 
|-id=279 bgcolor=#E9E9E9
| 116279 ||  || — || December 17, 2003 || Palomar || NEAT || — || align=right | 2.6 km || 
|-id=280 bgcolor=#d6d6d6
| 116280 ||  || — || December 17, 2003 || Kitt Peak || Spacewatch || 3:2 || align=right | 9.3 km || 
|-id=281 bgcolor=#d6d6d6
| 116281 ||  || — || December 18, 2003 || Socorro || LINEAR || — || align=right | 2.9 km || 
|-id=282 bgcolor=#d6d6d6
| 116282 ||  || — || December 18, 2003 || Socorro || LINEAR || — || align=right | 7.5 km || 
|-id=283 bgcolor=#fefefe
| 116283 ||  || — || December 18, 2003 || Socorro || LINEAR || NYS || align=right | 1.1 km || 
|-id=284 bgcolor=#d6d6d6
| 116284 ||  || — || December 18, 2003 || Socorro || LINEAR || — || align=right | 3.6 km || 
|-id=285 bgcolor=#fefefe
| 116285 ||  || — || December 18, 2003 || Socorro || LINEAR || — || align=right | 1.5 km || 
|-id=286 bgcolor=#E9E9E9
| 116286 ||  || — || December 19, 2003 || Socorro || LINEAR || — || align=right | 2.7 km || 
|-id=287 bgcolor=#d6d6d6
| 116287 ||  || — || December 19, 2003 || Kitt Peak || Spacewatch || — || align=right | 4.7 km || 
|-id=288 bgcolor=#d6d6d6
| 116288 ||  || — || December 19, 2003 || Socorro || LINEAR || KAR || align=right | 2.3 km || 
|-id=289 bgcolor=#E9E9E9
| 116289 ||  || — || December 19, 2003 || Socorro || LINEAR || — || align=right | 2.0 km || 
|-id=290 bgcolor=#d6d6d6
| 116290 ||  || — || December 19, 2003 || Socorro || LINEAR || THM || align=right | 4.1 km || 
|-id=291 bgcolor=#E9E9E9
| 116291 ||  || — || December 19, 2003 || Socorro || LINEAR || INO || align=right | 3.2 km || 
|-id=292 bgcolor=#E9E9E9
| 116292 ||  || — || December 19, 2003 || Socorro || LINEAR || — || align=right | 2.6 km || 
|-id=293 bgcolor=#E9E9E9
| 116293 ||  || — || December 19, 2003 || Socorro || LINEAR || — || align=right | 3.0 km || 
|-id=294 bgcolor=#d6d6d6
| 116294 ||  || — || December 19, 2003 || Socorro || LINEAR || 3:2 || align=right | 11 km || 
|-id=295 bgcolor=#E9E9E9
| 116295 ||  || — || December 19, 2003 || Socorro || LINEAR || — || align=right | 4.8 km || 
|-id=296 bgcolor=#d6d6d6
| 116296 ||  || — || December 19, 2003 || Socorro || LINEAR || EOS || align=right | 3.7 km || 
|-id=297 bgcolor=#fefefe
| 116297 ||  || — || December 19, 2003 || Kitt Peak || Spacewatch || NYS || align=right | 1.2 km || 
|-id=298 bgcolor=#d6d6d6
| 116298 ||  || — || December 19, 2003 || Kitt Peak || Spacewatch || THM || align=right | 3.2 km || 
|-id=299 bgcolor=#fefefe
| 116299 ||  || — || December 19, 2003 || Kitt Peak || Spacewatch || — || align=right | 1.4 km || 
|-id=300 bgcolor=#d6d6d6
| 116300 ||  || — || December 19, 2003 || Socorro || LINEAR || EUP || align=right | 6.3 km || 
|}

116301–116400 

|-bgcolor=#d6d6d6
| 116301 ||  || — || December 19, 2003 || Socorro || LINEAR || slow || align=right | 5.2 km || 
|-id=302 bgcolor=#d6d6d6
| 116302 ||  || — || December 19, 2003 || Socorro || LINEAR || THM || align=right | 5.9 km || 
|-id=303 bgcolor=#E9E9E9
| 116303 ||  || — || December 19, 2003 || Socorro || LINEAR || — || align=right | 1.9 km || 
|-id=304 bgcolor=#fefefe
| 116304 ||  || — || December 19, 2003 || Socorro || LINEAR || — || align=right | 2.0 km || 
|-id=305 bgcolor=#E9E9E9
| 116305 ||  || — || December 19, 2003 || Socorro || LINEAR || EUN || align=right | 2.7 km || 
|-id=306 bgcolor=#E9E9E9
| 116306 ||  || — || December 19, 2003 || Socorro || LINEAR || ADE || align=right | 6.1 km || 
|-id=307 bgcolor=#d6d6d6
| 116307 ||  || — || December 19, 2003 || Socorro || LINEAR || — || align=right | 3.8 km || 
|-id=308 bgcolor=#fefefe
| 116308 ||  || — || December 19, 2003 || Socorro || LINEAR || — || align=right | 1.9 km || 
|-id=309 bgcolor=#E9E9E9
| 116309 ||  || — || December 19, 2003 || Socorro || LINEAR || — || align=right | 2.5 km || 
|-id=310 bgcolor=#d6d6d6
| 116310 ||  || — || December 19, 2003 || Socorro || LINEAR || — || align=right | 4.7 km || 
|-id=311 bgcolor=#d6d6d6
| 116311 ||  || — || December 19, 2003 || Socorro || LINEAR || — || align=right | 5.0 km || 
|-id=312 bgcolor=#E9E9E9
| 116312 ||  || — || December 19, 2003 || Socorro || LINEAR || — || align=right | 3.2 km || 
|-id=313 bgcolor=#d6d6d6
| 116313 ||  || — || December 19, 2003 || Haleakala || NEAT || — || align=right | 7.4 km || 
|-id=314 bgcolor=#E9E9E9
| 116314 ||  || — || December 20, 2003 || Socorro || LINEAR || — || align=right | 3.9 km || 
|-id=315 bgcolor=#fefefe
| 116315 ||  || — || December 20, 2003 || Socorro || LINEAR || FLO || align=right | 1.2 km || 
|-id=316 bgcolor=#d6d6d6
| 116316 ||  || — || December 19, 2003 || Socorro || LINEAR || EOS || align=right | 3.6 km || 
|-id=317 bgcolor=#E9E9E9
| 116317 ||  || — || December 20, 2003 || Socorro || LINEAR || — || align=right | 3.0 km || 
|-id=318 bgcolor=#E9E9E9
| 116318 ||  || — || December 20, 2003 || Socorro || LINEAR || — || align=right | 2.6 km || 
|-id=319 bgcolor=#d6d6d6
| 116319 ||  || — || December 20, 2003 || Socorro || LINEAR || — || align=right | 5.3 km || 
|-id=320 bgcolor=#d6d6d6
| 116320 ||  || — || December 21, 2003 || Socorro || LINEAR || — || align=right | 3.4 km || 
|-id=321 bgcolor=#d6d6d6
| 116321 ||  || — || December 21, 2003 || Socorro || LINEAR || URS || align=right | 6.5 km || 
|-id=322 bgcolor=#fefefe
| 116322 ||  || — || December 18, 2003 || Socorro || LINEAR || — || align=right | 2.7 km || 
|-id=323 bgcolor=#E9E9E9
| 116323 ||  || — || December 18, 2003 || Socorro || LINEAR || — || align=right | 3.2 km || 
|-id=324 bgcolor=#d6d6d6
| 116324 ||  || — || December 18, 2003 || Socorro || LINEAR || — || align=right | 5.9 km || 
|-id=325 bgcolor=#E9E9E9
| 116325 ||  || — || December 18, 2003 || Socorro || LINEAR || MIT || align=right | 6.7 km || 
|-id=326 bgcolor=#fefefe
| 116326 ||  || — || December 18, 2003 || Socorro || LINEAR || V || align=right | 1.2 km || 
|-id=327 bgcolor=#E9E9E9
| 116327 ||  || — || December 18, 2003 || Socorro || LINEAR || — || align=right | 1.9 km || 
|-id=328 bgcolor=#fefefe
| 116328 ||  || — || December 18, 2003 || Socorro || LINEAR || — || align=right | 1.6 km || 
|-id=329 bgcolor=#d6d6d6
| 116329 ||  || — || December 18, 2003 || Socorro || LINEAR || — || align=right | 5.8 km || 
|-id=330 bgcolor=#fefefe
| 116330 ||  || — || December 18, 2003 || Socorro || LINEAR || — || align=right | 1.3 km || 
|-id=331 bgcolor=#E9E9E9
| 116331 ||  || — || December 18, 2003 || Socorro || LINEAR || — || align=right | 2.8 km || 
|-id=332 bgcolor=#E9E9E9
| 116332 ||  || — || December 18, 2003 || Socorro || LINEAR || — || align=right | 2.5 km || 
|-id=333 bgcolor=#d6d6d6
| 116333 ||  || — || December 18, 2003 || Socorro || LINEAR || HYG || align=right | 6.1 km || 
|-id=334 bgcolor=#d6d6d6
| 116334 ||  || — || December 18, 2003 || Socorro || LINEAR || — || align=right | 4.6 km || 
|-id=335 bgcolor=#d6d6d6
| 116335 ||  || — || December 18, 2003 || Socorro || LINEAR || — || align=right | 7.6 km || 
|-id=336 bgcolor=#d6d6d6
| 116336 ||  || — || December 18, 2003 || Socorro || LINEAR || — || align=right | 6.4 km || 
|-id=337 bgcolor=#E9E9E9
| 116337 ||  || — || December 18, 2003 || Socorro || LINEAR || — || align=right | 2.2 km || 
|-id=338 bgcolor=#E9E9E9
| 116338 ||  || — || December 18, 2003 || Socorro || LINEAR || — || align=right | 1.9 km || 
|-id=339 bgcolor=#E9E9E9
| 116339 ||  || — || December 18, 2003 || Socorro || LINEAR || — || align=right | 1.9 km || 
|-id=340 bgcolor=#E9E9E9
| 116340 ||  || — || December 18, 2003 || Socorro || LINEAR || — || align=right | 6.2 km || 
|-id=341 bgcolor=#E9E9E9
| 116341 ||  || — || December 18, 2003 || Socorro || LINEAR || — || align=right | 5.1 km || 
|-id=342 bgcolor=#d6d6d6
| 116342 ||  || — || December 18, 2003 || Socorro || LINEAR || — || align=right | 8.2 km || 
|-id=343 bgcolor=#fefefe
| 116343 ||  || — || December 19, 2003 || Socorro || LINEAR || FLO || align=right | 1.3 km || 
|-id=344 bgcolor=#E9E9E9
| 116344 ||  || — || December 19, 2003 || Socorro || LINEAR || AGN || align=right | 2.4 km || 
|-id=345 bgcolor=#d6d6d6
| 116345 ||  || — || December 19, 2003 || Socorro || LINEAR || VER || align=right | 7.0 km || 
|-id=346 bgcolor=#d6d6d6
| 116346 ||  || — || December 19, 2003 || Socorro || LINEAR || HYG || align=right | 5.9 km || 
|-id=347 bgcolor=#E9E9E9
| 116347 ||  || — || December 19, 2003 || Socorro || LINEAR || INO || align=right | 2.8 km || 
|-id=348 bgcolor=#d6d6d6
| 116348 ||  || — || December 19, 2003 || Socorro || LINEAR || TRP || align=right | 4.8 km || 
|-id=349 bgcolor=#E9E9E9
| 116349 ||  || — || December 19, 2003 || Socorro || LINEAR || — || align=right | 2.3 km || 
|-id=350 bgcolor=#fefefe
| 116350 ||  || — || December 19, 2003 || Kitt Peak || Spacewatch || V || align=right | 1.1 km || 
|-id=351 bgcolor=#E9E9E9
| 116351 ||  || — || December 19, 2003 || Kitt Peak || Spacewatch || — || align=right | 3.9 km || 
|-id=352 bgcolor=#d6d6d6
| 116352 ||  || — || December 20, 2003 || Socorro || LINEAR || LIX || align=right | 6.8 km || 
|-id=353 bgcolor=#d6d6d6
| 116353 ||  || — || December 20, 2003 || Socorro || LINEAR || — || align=right | 6.0 km || 
|-id=354 bgcolor=#d6d6d6
| 116354 ||  || — || December 20, 2003 || Socorro || LINEAR || — || align=right | 4.5 km || 
|-id=355 bgcolor=#E9E9E9
| 116355 ||  || — || December 20, 2003 || Haleakala || NEAT || — || align=right | 5.5 km || 
|-id=356 bgcolor=#d6d6d6
| 116356 ||  || — || December 21, 2003 || Catalina || CSS || EOS || align=right | 4.3 km || 
|-id=357 bgcolor=#d6d6d6
| 116357 ||  || — || December 21, 2003 || Catalina || CSS || — || align=right | 4.1 km || 
|-id=358 bgcolor=#E9E9E9
| 116358 ||  || — || December 21, 2003 || Kitt Peak || Spacewatch || — || align=right | 3.3 km || 
|-id=359 bgcolor=#d6d6d6
| 116359 ||  || — || December 19, 2003 || Socorro || LINEAR || THM || align=right | 4.0 km || 
|-id=360 bgcolor=#E9E9E9
| 116360 ||  || — || December 19, 2003 || Socorro || LINEAR || — || align=right | 4.7 km || 
|-id=361 bgcolor=#fefefe
| 116361 ||  || — || December 19, 2003 || Socorro || LINEAR || — || align=right | 1.9 km || 
|-id=362 bgcolor=#E9E9E9
| 116362 ||  || — || December 19, 2003 || Socorro || LINEAR || — || align=right | 4.8 km || 
|-id=363 bgcolor=#E9E9E9
| 116363 ||  || — || December 19, 2003 || Socorro || LINEAR || — || align=right | 1.8 km || 
|-id=364 bgcolor=#d6d6d6
| 116364 ||  || — || December 19, 2003 || Socorro || LINEAR || — || align=right | 4.0 km || 
|-id=365 bgcolor=#d6d6d6
| 116365 ||  || — || December 19, 2003 || Socorro || LINEAR || EOS || align=right | 3.5 km || 
|-id=366 bgcolor=#E9E9E9
| 116366 ||  || — || December 19, 2003 || Socorro || LINEAR || — || align=right | 3.6 km || 
|-id=367 bgcolor=#fefefe
| 116367 ||  || — || December 19, 2003 || Socorro || LINEAR || V || align=right | 1.6 km || 
|-id=368 bgcolor=#d6d6d6
| 116368 ||  || — || December 21, 2003 || Socorro || LINEAR || — || align=right | 4.2 km || 
|-id=369 bgcolor=#fefefe
| 116369 ||  || — || December 22, 2003 || Socorro || LINEAR || — || align=right | 2.0 km || 
|-id=370 bgcolor=#E9E9E9
| 116370 ||  || — || December 22, 2003 || Socorro || LINEAR || — || align=right | 4.3 km || 
|-id=371 bgcolor=#E9E9E9
| 116371 ||  || — || December 22, 2003 || Kitt Peak || Spacewatch || — || align=right | 2.5 km || 
|-id=372 bgcolor=#E9E9E9
| 116372 ||  || — || December 21, 2003 || Catalina || CSS || — || align=right | 3.3 km || 
|-id=373 bgcolor=#E9E9E9
| 116373 ||  || — || December 21, 2003 || Catalina || CSS || — || align=right | 4.8 km || 
|-id=374 bgcolor=#E9E9E9
| 116374 ||  || — || December 23, 2003 || Socorro || LINEAR || INO || align=right | 2.5 km || 
|-id=375 bgcolor=#d6d6d6
| 116375 ||  || — || December 23, 2003 || Socorro || LINEAR || HYG || align=right | 6.2 km || 
|-id=376 bgcolor=#d6d6d6
| 116376 ||  || — || December 23, 2003 || Socorro || LINEAR || EUP || align=right | 8.6 km || 
|-id=377 bgcolor=#fefefe
| 116377 ||  || — || December 23, 2003 || Socorro || LINEAR || — || align=right | 1.7 km || 
|-id=378 bgcolor=#E9E9E9
| 116378 ||  || — || December 25, 2003 || Kitt Peak || Spacewatch || — || align=right | 2.7 km || 
|-id=379 bgcolor=#E9E9E9
| 116379 ||  || — || December 27, 2003 || Kitt Peak || Spacewatch || PAD || align=right | 3.0 km || 
|-id=380 bgcolor=#d6d6d6
| 116380 ||  || — || December 27, 2003 || Socorro || LINEAR || — || align=right | 6.4 km || 
|-id=381 bgcolor=#E9E9E9
| 116381 ||  || — || December 27, 2003 || Socorro || LINEAR || — || align=right | 2.1 km || 
|-id=382 bgcolor=#fefefe
| 116382 ||  || — || December 27, 2003 || Socorro || LINEAR || V || align=right | 1.5 km || 
|-id=383 bgcolor=#d6d6d6
| 116383 ||  || — || December 27, 2003 || Socorro || LINEAR || — || align=right | 6.5 km || 
|-id=384 bgcolor=#E9E9E9
| 116384 ||  || — || December 28, 2003 || Kitt Peak || Spacewatch || — || align=right | 2.5 km || 
|-id=385 bgcolor=#d6d6d6
| 116385 ||  || — || December 28, 2003 || Socorro || LINEAR || — || align=right | 5.2 km || 
|-id=386 bgcolor=#E9E9E9
| 116386 ||  || — || December 27, 2003 || Kitt Peak || Spacewatch || — || align=right | 3.6 km || 
|-id=387 bgcolor=#E9E9E9
| 116387 ||  || — || December 27, 2003 || Socorro || LINEAR || ADE || align=right | 5.2 km || 
|-id=388 bgcolor=#d6d6d6
| 116388 ||  || — || December 27, 2003 || Socorro || LINEAR || — || align=right | 6.4 km || 
|-id=389 bgcolor=#E9E9E9
| 116389 ||  || — || December 27, 2003 || Socorro || LINEAR || — || align=right | 4.2 km || 
|-id=390 bgcolor=#d6d6d6
| 116390 ||  || — || December 27, 2003 || Socorro || LINEAR || EOS || align=right | 3.6 km || 
|-id=391 bgcolor=#E9E9E9
| 116391 ||  || — || December 27, 2003 || Socorro || LINEAR || — || align=right | 2.8 km || 
|-id=392 bgcolor=#E9E9E9
| 116392 ||  || — || December 27, 2003 || Socorro || LINEAR || — || align=right | 3.3 km || 
|-id=393 bgcolor=#fefefe
| 116393 ||  || — || December 27, 2003 || Socorro || LINEAR || — || align=right | 2.0 km || 
|-id=394 bgcolor=#d6d6d6
| 116394 ||  || — || December 27, 2003 || Socorro || LINEAR || EOS || align=right | 6.3 km || 
|-id=395 bgcolor=#fefefe
| 116395 ||  || — || December 27, 2003 || Socorro || LINEAR || — || align=right | 1.7 km || 
|-id=396 bgcolor=#E9E9E9
| 116396 ||  || — || December 28, 2003 || Socorro || LINEAR || — || align=right | 2.8 km || 
|-id=397 bgcolor=#d6d6d6
| 116397 ||  || — || December 28, 2003 || Socorro || LINEAR || EOS || align=right | 3.7 km || 
|-id=398 bgcolor=#d6d6d6
| 116398 ||  || — || December 28, 2003 || Socorro || LINEAR || EOS || align=right | 4.4 km || 
|-id=399 bgcolor=#E9E9E9
| 116399 ||  || — || December 28, 2003 || Socorro || LINEAR || — || align=right | 3.8 km || 
|-id=400 bgcolor=#d6d6d6
| 116400 ||  || — || December 28, 2003 || Socorro || LINEAR || — || align=right | 5.5 km || 
|}

116401–116500 

|-bgcolor=#fefefe
| 116401 ||  || — || December 28, 2003 || Socorro || LINEAR || H || align=right | 1.3 km || 
|-id=402 bgcolor=#E9E9E9
| 116402 ||  || — || December 28, 2003 || Socorro || LINEAR || — || align=right | 3.1 km || 
|-id=403 bgcolor=#d6d6d6
| 116403 ||  || — || December 28, 2003 || Socorro || LINEAR || — || align=right | 3.8 km || 
|-id=404 bgcolor=#fefefe
| 116404 ||  || — || December 28, 2003 || Kitt Peak || Spacewatch || — || align=right | 1.8 km || 
|-id=405 bgcolor=#d6d6d6
| 116405 ||  || — || December 28, 2003 || Kitt Peak || Spacewatch || ALA || align=right | 7.4 km || 
|-id=406 bgcolor=#d6d6d6
| 116406 ||  || — || December 18, 2003 || Palomar || NEAT || EOS || align=right | 3.8 km || 
|-id=407 bgcolor=#d6d6d6
| 116407 ||  || — || December 25, 2003 || Socorro || LINEAR || — || align=right | 3.6 km || 
|-id=408 bgcolor=#E9E9E9
| 116408 ||  || — || December 27, 2003 || Socorro || LINEAR || — || align=right | 1.8 km || 
|-id=409 bgcolor=#fefefe
| 116409 ||  || — || December 27, 2003 || Socorro || LINEAR || NYS || align=right | 1.4 km || 
|-id=410 bgcolor=#d6d6d6
| 116410 ||  || — || December 27, 2003 || Socorro || LINEAR || — || align=right | 8.1 km || 
|-id=411 bgcolor=#d6d6d6
| 116411 ||  || — || December 27, 2003 || Haleakala || NEAT || THM || align=right | 4.7 km || 
|-id=412 bgcolor=#fefefe
| 116412 ||  || — || December 27, 2003 || Kitt Peak || Spacewatch || NYS || align=right | 1.3 km || 
|-id=413 bgcolor=#E9E9E9
| 116413 ||  || — || December 28, 2003 || Socorro || LINEAR || — || align=right | 3.5 km || 
|-id=414 bgcolor=#d6d6d6
| 116414 ||  || — || December 28, 2003 || Socorro || LINEAR || — || align=right | 4.8 km || 
|-id=415 bgcolor=#d6d6d6
| 116415 ||  || — || December 28, 2003 || Socorro || LINEAR || — || align=right | 3.6 km || 
|-id=416 bgcolor=#E9E9E9
| 116416 ||  || — || December 28, 2003 || Socorro || LINEAR || — || align=right | 4.4 km || 
|-id=417 bgcolor=#E9E9E9
| 116417 ||  || — || December 28, 2003 || Socorro || LINEAR || — || align=right | 4.2 km || 
|-id=418 bgcolor=#d6d6d6
| 116418 ||  || — || December 28, 2003 || Socorro || LINEAR || ITH || align=right | 2.7 km || 
|-id=419 bgcolor=#E9E9E9
| 116419 ||  || — || December 28, 2003 || Socorro || LINEAR || — || align=right | 3.8 km || 
|-id=420 bgcolor=#E9E9E9
| 116420 ||  || — || December 28, 2003 || Socorro || LINEAR || — || align=right | 6.4 km || 
|-id=421 bgcolor=#d6d6d6
| 116421 ||  || — || December 29, 2003 || Catalina || CSS || — || align=right | 4.0 km || 
|-id=422 bgcolor=#d6d6d6
| 116422 ||  || — || December 29, 2003 || Catalina || CSS || — || align=right | 4.7 km || 
|-id=423 bgcolor=#E9E9E9
| 116423 ||  || — || December 29, 2003 || Socorro || LINEAR || — || align=right | 3.8 km || 
|-id=424 bgcolor=#d6d6d6
| 116424 ||  || — || December 29, 2003 || Catalina || CSS || — || align=right | 7.2 km || 
|-id=425 bgcolor=#d6d6d6
| 116425 ||  || — || December 29, 2003 || Catalina || CSS || — || align=right | 7.6 km || 
|-id=426 bgcolor=#d6d6d6
| 116426 ||  || — || December 29, 2003 || Catalina || CSS || — || align=right | 6.8 km || 
|-id=427 bgcolor=#E9E9E9
| 116427 ||  || — || December 29, 2003 || Catalina || CSS || EUN || align=right | 3.9 km || 
|-id=428 bgcolor=#E9E9E9
| 116428 ||  || — || December 29, 2003 || Socorro || LINEAR || — || align=right | 3.2 km || 
|-id=429 bgcolor=#d6d6d6
| 116429 ||  || — || December 29, 2003 || Catalina || CSS || — || align=right | 6.3 km || 
|-id=430 bgcolor=#E9E9E9
| 116430 ||  || — || December 29, 2003 || Catalina || CSS || JUN || align=right | 2.2 km || 
|-id=431 bgcolor=#fefefe
| 116431 ||  || — || December 29, 2003 || Kitt Peak || Spacewatch || — || align=right | 1.5 km || 
|-id=432 bgcolor=#d6d6d6
| 116432 ||  || — || December 29, 2003 || Socorro || LINEAR || — || align=right | 9.6 km || 
|-id=433 bgcolor=#E9E9E9
| 116433 ||  || — || December 29, 2003 || Socorro || LINEAR || — || align=right | 5.9 km || 
|-id=434 bgcolor=#E9E9E9
| 116434 ||  || — || December 29, 2003 || Socorro || LINEAR || — || align=right | 4.4 km || 
|-id=435 bgcolor=#E9E9E9
| 116435 ||  || — || December 30, 2003 || Socorro || LINEAR || EUN || align=right | 2.4 km || 
|-id=436 bgcolor=#d6d6d6
| 116436 ||  || — || December 17, 2003 || Socorro || LINEAR || EOS || align=right | 4.1 km || 
|-id=437 bgcolor=#E9E9E9
| 116437 ||  || — || December 17, 2003 || Socorro || LINEAR || — || align=right | 2.2 km || 
|-id=438 bgcolor=#E9E9E9
| 116438 ||  || — || December 17, 2003 || Socorro || LINEAR || MRX || align=right | 1.7 km || 
|-id=439 bgcolor=#C2FFFF
| 116439 ||  || — || December 17, 2003 || Socorro || LINEAR || L5 || align=right | 13 km || 
|-id=440 bgcolor=#fefefe
| 116440 ||  || — || December 17, 2003 || Kitt Peak || Spacewatch || FLO || align=right | 1.2 km || 
|-id=441 bgcolor=#fefefe
| 116441 ||  || — || December 17, 2003 || Kitt Peak || Spacewatch || — || align=right | 1.6 km || 
|-id=442 bgcolor=#E9E9E9
| 116442 ||  || — || December 18, 2003 || Socorro || LINEAR || — || align=right | 3.4 km || 
|-id=443 bgcolor=#d6d6d6
| 116443 ||  || — || December 18, 2003 || Socorro || LINEAR || — || align=right | 3.2 km || 
|-id=444 bgcolor=#E9E9E9
| 116444 ||  || — || December 19, 2003 || Socorro || LINEAR || — || align=right | 4.4 km || 
|-id=445 bgcolor=#fefefe
| 116445 ||  || — || December 19, 2003 || Kitt Peak || Spacewatch || MAS || align=right | 1.3 km || 
|-id=446 bgcolor=#E9E9E9
| 116446 McDermid || 2004 AG ||  || January 5, 2004 || Wrightwood || J. W. Young || AST || align=right | 3.7 km || 
|-id=447 bgcolor=#d6d6d6
| 116447 || 2004 AJ || — || January 11, 2004 || Palomar || NEAT || — || align=right | 9.9 km || 
|-id=448 bgcolor=#d6d6d6
| 116448 || 2004 AT || — || January 12, 2004 || Palomar || NEAT || — || align=right | 7.2 km || 
|-id=449 bgcolor=#d6d6d6
| 116449 || 2004 AU || — || January 12, 2004 || Palomar || NEAT || LIX || align=right | 7.2 km || 
|-id=450 bgcolor=#d6d6d6
| 116450 || 2004 AW || — || January 12, 2004 || Palomar || NEAT || 7:4 || align=right | 8.6 km || 
|-id=451 bgcolor=#d6d6d6
| 116451 ||  || — || January 12, 2004 || Palomar || NEAT || — || align=right | 5.5 km || 
|-id=452 bgcolor=#d6d6d6
| 116452 ||  || — || January 12, 2004 || Palomar || NEAT || — || align=right | 6.0 km || 
|-id=453 bgcolor=#d6d6d6
| 116453 ||  || — || January 12, 2004 || Palomar || NEAT || — || align=right | 3.6 km || 
|-id=454 bgcolor=#E9E9E9
| 116454 ||  || — || January 13, 2004 || Anderson Mesa || LONEOS || — || align=right | 3.4 km || 
|-id=455 bgcolor=#E9E9E9
| 116455 ||  || — || January 13, 2004 || Anderson Mesa || LONEOS || — || align=right | 2.4 km || 
|-id=456 bgcolor=#d6d6d6
| 116456 ||  || — || January 13, 2004 || Anderson Mesa || LONEOS || HYG || align=right | 3.5 km || 
|-id=457 bgcolor=#fefefe
| 116457 ||  || — || January 13, 2004 || Anderson Mesa || LONEOS || NYS || align=right | 1.7 km || 
|-id=458 bgcolor=#d6d6d6
| 116458 ||  || — || January 13, 2004 || Anderson Mesa || LONEOS || — || align=right | 5.7 km || 
|-id=459 bgcolor=#fefefe
| 116459 ||  || — || January 13, 2004 || Palomar || NEAT || NYS || align=right | 1.3 km || 
|-id=460 bgcolor=#d6d6d6
| 116460 ||  || — || January 14, 2004 || Palomar || NEAT || EOS || align=right | 3.7 km || 
|-id=461 bgcolor=#d6d6d6
| 116461 ||  || — || January 13, 2004 || Anderson Mesa || LONEOS || — || align=right | 5.9 km || 
|-id=462 bgcolor=#E9E9E9
| 116462 ||  || — || January 13, 2004 || Anderson Mesa || LONEOS || EUN || align=right | 2.1 km || 
|-id=463 bgcolor=#E9E9E9
| 116463 ||  || — || January 14, 2004 || Palomar || NEAT || — || align=right | 4.1 km || 
|-id=464 bgcolor=#E9E9E9
| 116464 ||  || — || January 14, 2004 || Palomar || NEAT || MAR || align=right | 1.7 km || 
|-id=465 bgcolor=#d6d6d6
| 116465 ||  || — || January 14, 2004 || Palomar || NEAT || EOS || align=right | 3.2 km || 
|-id=466 bgcolor=#d6d6d6
| 116466 ||  || — || January 15, 2004 || Kitt Peak || Spacewatch || — || align=right | 5.1 km || 
|-id=467 bgcolor=#E9E9E9
| 116467 ||  || — || January 15, 2004 || Kitt Peak || Spacewatch || — || align=right | 2.0 km || 
|-id=468 bgcolor=#d6d6d6
| 116468 ||  || — || January 2, 2004 || Socorro || LINEAR || — || align=right | 7.6 km || 
|-id=469 bgcolor=#d6d6d6
| 116469 ||  || — || January 15, 2004 || Kitt Peak || Spacewatch || KOR || align=right | 1.9 km || 
|-id=470 bgcolor=#E9E9E9
| 116470 ||  || — || January 15, 2004 || Kitt Peak || Spacewatch || — || align=right | 1.6 km || 
|-id=471 bgcolor=#fefefe
| 116471 ||  || — || January 13, 2004 || Palomar || NEAT || — || align=right | 1.8 km || 
|-id=472 bgcolor=#d6d6d6
| 116472 ||  || — || January 16, 2004 || Palomar || NEAT || — || align=right | 5.3 km || 
|-id=473 bgcolor=#d6d6d6
| 116473 ||  || — || January 16, 2004 || Palomar || NEAT || — || align=right | 5.2 km || 
|-id=474 bgcolor=#E9E9E9
| 116474 ||  || — || January 16, 2004 || Palomar || NEAT || NEM || align=right | 4.2 km || 
|-id=475 bgcolor=#d6d6d6
| 116475 ||  || — || January 16, 2004 || Palomar || NEAT || — || align=right | 6.0 km || 
|-id=476 bgcolor=#E9E9E9
| 116476 ||  || — || January 16, 2004 || Palomar || NEAT || MRX || align=right | 2.2 km || 
|-id=477 bgcolor=#d6d6d6
| 116477 ||  || — || January 16, 2004 || Kitt Peak || Spacewatch || — || align=right | 3.0 km || 
|-id=478 bgcolor=#d6d6d6
| 116478 ||  || — || January 16, 2004 || Kitt Peak || Spacewatch || — || align=right | 3.2 km || 
|-id=479 bgcolor=#fefefe
| 116479 ||  || — || January 16, 2004 || Kitt Peak || Spacewatch || — || align=right | 1.2 km || 
|-id=480 bgcolor=#E9E9E9
| 116480 ||  || — || January 17, 2004 || Haleakala || NEAT || — || align=right | 4.7 km || 
|-id=481 bgcolor=#d6d6d6
| 116481 ||  || — || January 16, 2004 || Anderson Mesa || LONEOS || FIR || align=right | 5.9 km || 
|-id=482 bgcolor=#E9E9E9
| 116482 ||  || — || January 16, 2004 || Catalina || CSS || — || align=right | 3.9 km || 
|-id=483 bgcolor=#E9E9E9
| 116483 ||  || — || January 17, 2004 || Kitt Peak || Spacewatch || AGN || align=right | 1.9 km || 
|-id=484 bgcolor=#fefefe
| 116484 ||  || — || January 16, 2004 || Palomar || NEAT || — || align=right | 1.5 km || 
|-id=485 bgcolor=#d6d6d6
| 116485 ||  || — || January 17, 2004 || Haleakala || NEAT || — || align=right | 8.2 km || 
|-id=486 bgcolor=#d6d6d6
| 116486 ||  || — || January 16, 2004 || Palomar || NEAT || — || align=right | 4.5 km || 
|-id=487 bgcolor=#d6d6d6
| 116487 ||  || — || January 16, 2004 || Palomar || NEAT || — || align=right | 3.6 km || 
|-id=488 bgcolor=#E9E9E9
| 116488 ||  || — || January 16, 2004 || Palomar || NEAT || — || align=right | 4.7 km || 
|-id=489 bgcolor=#d6d6d6
| 116489 ||  || — || January 17, 2004 || Palomar || NEAT || 3:2 || align=right | 7.1 km || 
|-id=490 bgcolor=#d6d6d6
| 116490 ||  || — || January 17, 2004 || Palomar || NEAT || — || align=right | 4.5 km || 
|-id=491 bgcolor=#d6d6d6
| 116491 ||  || — || January 17, 2004 || Palomar || NEAT || — || align=right | 6.5 km || 
|-id=492 bgcolor=#E9E9E9
| 116492 ||  || — || January 17, 2004 || Palomar || NEAT || — || align=right | 2.9 km || 
|-id=493 bgcolor=#d6d6d6
| 116493 ||  || — || January 17, 2004 || Palomar || NEAT || 7:4 || align=right | 5.5 km || 
|-id=494 bgcolor=#d6d6d6
| 116494 ||  || — || January 16, 2004 || Kitt Peak || Spacewatch || — || align=right | 4.8 km || 
|-id=495 bgcolor=#E9E9E9
| 116495 ||  || — || January 17, 2004 || Palomar || NEAT || MAR || align=right | 2.2 km || 
|-id=496 bgcolor=#E9E9E9
| 116496 ||  || — || January 18, 2004 || Palomar || NEAT || EUN || align=right | 3.3 km || 
|-id=497 bgcolor=#E9E9E9
| 116497 ||  || — || January 17, 2004 || Palomar || NEAT || MAR || align=right | 3.6 km || 
|-id=498 bgcolor=#d6d6d6
| 116498 ||  || — || January 17, 2004 || Palomar || NEAT || 7:4 || align=right | 8.4 km || 
|-id=499 bgcolor=#E9E9E9
| 116499 ||  || — || January 17, 2004 || Kitt Peak || Spacewatch || MRX || align=right | 2.0 km || 
|-id=500 bgcolor=#d6d6d6
| 116500 ||  || — || January 17, 2004 || Palomar || NEAT || KOR || align=right | 3.1 km || 
|}

116501–116600 

|-bgcolor=#fefefe
| 116501 ||  || — || January 17, 2004 || Palomar || NEAT || V || align=right | 1.2 km || 
|-id=502 bgcolor=#d6d6d6
| 116502 ||  || — || January 17, 2004 || Kitt Peak || Spacewatch || — || align=right | 7.1 km || 
|-id=503 bgcolor=#d6d6d6
| 116503 ||  || — || January 18, 2004 || Palomar || NEAT || KOR || align=right | 2.6 km || 
|-id=504 bgcolor=#fefefe
| 116504 ||  || — || January 19, 2004 || Anderson Mesa || LONEOS || V || align=right | 1.3 km || 
|-id=505 bgcolor=#fefefe
| 116505 ||  || — || January 19, 2004 || Catalina || CSS || NYS || align=right | 1.2 km || 
|-id=506 bgcolor=#E9E9E9
| 116506 ||  || — || January 19, 2004 || Socorro || LINEAR || — || align=right | 3.2 km || 
|-id=507 bgcolor=#d6d6d6
| 116507 ||  || — || January 21, 2004 || Socorro || LINEAR || KOR || align=right | 2.9 km || 
|-id=508 bgcolor=#fefefe
| 116508 ||  || — || January 21, 2004 || Socorro || LINEAR || MAS || align=right | 1.1 km || 
|-id=509 bgcolor=#fefefe
| 116509 ||  || — || January 19, 2004 || Haleakala || NEAT || PHO || align=right | 2.3 km || 
|-id=510 bgcolor=#E9E9E9
| 116510 ||  || — || January 18, 2004 || Palomar || NEAT || — || align=right | 2.7 km || 
|-id=511 bgcolor=#d6d6d6
| 116511 ||  || — || January 19, 2004 || Kitt Peak || Spacewatch || KOR || align=right | 2.0 km || 
|-id=512 bgcolor=#d6d6d6
| 116512 ||  || — || January 20, 2004 || Socorro || LINEAR || 3:2 || align=right | 6.7 km || 
|-id=513 bgcolor=#fefefe
| 116513 ||  || — || January 21, 2004 || Socorro || LINEAR || — || align=right | 1.3 km || 
|-id=514 bgcolor=#fefefe
| 116514 ||  || — || January 21, 2004 || Socorro || LINEAR || — || align=right | 1.2 km || 
|-id=515 bgcolor=#d6d6d6
| 116515 ||  || — || January 21, 2004 || Socorro || LINEAR || — || align=right | 4.0 km || 
|-id=516 bgcolor=#d6d6d6
| 116516 ||  || — || January 19, 2004 || Catalina || CSS || ULA7:4 || align=right | 11 km || 
|-id=517 bgcolor=#E9E9E9
| 116517 ||  || — || January 19, 2004 || Catalina || CSS || — || align=right | 2.9 km || 
|-id=518 bgcolor=#d6d6d6
| 116518 ||  || — || January 19, 2004 || Catalina || CSS || — || align=right | 5.5 km || 
|-id=519 bgcolor=#E9E9E9
| 116519 ||  || — || January 22, 2004 || Socorro || LINEAR || — || align=right | 5.9 km || 
|-id=520 bgcolor=#d6d6d6
| 116520 ||  || — || January 22, 2004 || Socorro || LINEAR || — || align=right | 5.9 km || 
|-id=521 bgcolor=#fefefe
| 116521 ||  || — || January 22, 2004 || Socorro || LINEAR || — || align=right | 1.9 km || 
|-id=522 bgcolor=#fefefe
| 116522 ||  || — || January 21, 2004 || Socorro || LINEAR || H || align=right | 1.2 km || 
|-id=523 bgcolor=#E9E9E9
| 116523 ||  || — || January 21, 2004 || Socorro || LINEAR || EUN || align=right | 2.4 km || 
|-id=524 bgcolor=#d6d6d6
| 116524 ||  || — || January 21, 2004 || Socorro || LINEAR || EOS || align=right | 3.7 km || 
|-id=525 bgcolor=#E9E9E9
| 116525 ||  || — || January 21, 2004 || Socorro || LINEAR || MAR || align=right | 2.5 km || 
|-id=526 bgcolor=#d6d6d6
| 116526 ||  || — || January 21, 2004 || Socorro || LINEAR || — || align=right | 5.4 km || 
|-id=527 bgcolor=#fefefe
| 116527 ||  || — || January 21, 2004 || Socorro || LINEAR || ERI || align=right | 3.6 km || 
|-id=528 bgcolor=#fefefe
| 116528 ||  || — || January 21, 2004 || Socorro || LINEAR || — || align=right | 1.7 km || 
|-id=529 bgcolor=#d6d6d6
| 116529 ||  || — || January 21, 2004 || Socorro || LINEAR || — || align=right | 3.9 km || 
|-id=530 bgcolor=#E9E9E9
| 116530 ||  || — || January 22, 2004 || Socorro || LINEAR || — || align=right | 4.4 km || 
|-id=531 bgcolor=#fefefe
| 116531 ||  || — || January 22, 2004 || Socorro || LINEAR || FLO || align=right | 2.4 km || 
|-id=532 bgcolor=#fefefe
| 116532 ||  || — || January 23, 2004 || Anderson Mesa || LONEOS || NYS || align=right | 1.3 km || 
|-id=533 bgcolor=#d6d6d6
| 116533 ||  || — || January 23, 2004 || Socorro || LINEAR || — || align=right | 5.6 km || 
|-id=534 bgcolor=#d6d6d6
| 116534 ||  || — || January 23, 2004 || Anderson Mesa || LONEOS || — || align=right | 3.8 km || 
|-id=535 bgcolor=#d6d6d6
| 116535 ||  || — || January 23, 2004 || Socorro || LINEAR || — || align=right | 8.0 km || 
|-id=536 bgcolor=#fefefe
| 116536 ||  || — || January 23, 2004 || Socorro || LINEAR || — || align=right | 1.7 km || 
|-id=537 bgcolor=#d6d6d6
| 116537 ||  || — || January 23, 2004 || Anderson Mesa || LONEOS || — || align=right | 4.3 km || 
|-id=538 bgcolor=#fefefe
| 116538 ||  || — || January 24, 2004 || Socorro || LINEAR || — || align=right | 2.0 km || 
|-id=539 bgcolor=#d6d6d6
| 116539 ||  || — || January 21, 2004 || Socorro || LINEAR || — || align=right | 4.5 km || 
|-id=540 bgcolor=#d6d6d6
| 116540 ||  || — || January 21, 2004 || Socorro || LINEAR || THM || align=right | 5.4 km || 
|-id=541 bgcolor=#d6d6d6
| 116541 ||  || — || January 22, 2004 || Socorro || LINEAR || KOR || align=right | 2.7 km || 
|-id=542 bgcolor=#d6d6d6
| 116542 ||  || — || January 27, 2004 || Socorro || LINEAR || EUP || align=right | 7.0 km || 
|-id=543 bgcolor=#fefefe
| 116543 ||  || — || January 21, 2004 || Socorro || LINEAR || MAS || align=right | 1.3 km || 
|-id=544 bgcolor=#fefefe
| 116544 ||  || — || January 23, 2004 || Socorro || LINEAR || FLO || align=right | 1.2 km || 
|-id=545 bgcolor=#E9E9E9
| 116545 ||  || — || January 24, 2004 || Socorro || LINEAR || — || align=right | 4.5 km || 
|-id=546 bgcolor=#d6d6d6
| 116546 ||  || — || January 24, 2004 || Socorro || LINEAR || — || align=right | 5.4 km || 
|-id=547 bgcolor=#E9E9E9
| 116547 ||  || — || January 24, 2004 || Socorro || LINEAR || — || align=right | 3.0 km || 
|-id=548 bgcolor=#E9E9E9
| 116548 ||  || — || January 24, 2004 || Socorro || LINEAR || — || align=right | 1.4 km || 
|-id=549 bgcolor=#d6d6d6
| 116549 ||  || — || January 24, 2004 || Socorro || LINEAR || — || align=right | 4.2 km || 
|-id=550 bgcolor=#d6d6d6
| 116550 ||  || — || January 24, 2004 || Socorro || LINEAR || — || align=right | 6.2 km || 
|-id=551 bgcolor=#E9E9E9
| 116551 ||  || — || January 22, 2004 || Socorro || LINEAR || — || align=right | 3.4 km || 
|-id=552 bgcolor=#E9E9E9
| 116552 ||  || — || January 22, 2004 || Socorro || LINEAR || — || align=right | 3.1 km || 
|-id=553 bgcolor=#d6d6d6
| 116553 ||  || — || January 23, 2004 || Socorro || LINEAR || HYG || align=right | 5.1 km || 
|-id=554 bgcolor=#d6d6d6
| 116554 ||  || — || January 27, 2004 || Anderson Mesa || LONEOS || — || align=right | 7.0 km || 
|-id=555 bgcolor=#d6d6d6
| 116555 ||  || — || January 22, 2004 || Socorro || LINEAR || — || align=right | 4.3 km || 
|-id=556 bgcolor=#E9E9E9
| 116556 ||  || — || January 22, 2004 || Haleakala || NEAT || EUN || align=right | 2.9 km || 
|-id=557 bgcolor=#d6d6d6
| 116557 ||  || — || January 24, 2004 || Socorro || LINEAR || THM || align=right | 4.3 km || 
|-id=558 bgcolor=#d6d6d6
| 116558 ||  || — || January 27, 2004 || Anderson Mesa || LONEOS || LIX || align=right | 5.2 km || 
|-id=559 bgcolor=#d6d6d6
| 116559 ||  || — || January 23, 2004 || Socorro || LINEAR || — || align=right | 5.0 km || 
|-id=560 bgcolor=#E9E9E9
| 116560 ||  || — || January 23, 2004 || Socorro || LINEAR || — || align=right | 2.0 km || 
|-id=561 bgcolor=#fefefe
| 116561 ||  || — || January 23, 2004 || Socorro || LINEAR || — || align=right | 1.9 km || 
|-id=562 bgcolor=#fefefe
| 116562 ||  || — || January 23, 2004 || Socorro || LINEAR || — || align=right | 1.1 km || 
|-id=563 bgcolor=#E9E9E9
| 116563 ||  || — || January 22, 2004 || Socorro || LINEAR || — || align=right | 6.1 km || 
|-id=564 bgcolor=#E9E9E9
| 116564 ||  || — || January 23, 2004 || Anderson Mesa || LONEOS || — || align=right | 3.3 km || 
|-id=565 bgcolor=#E9E9E9
| 116565 ||  || — || January 25, 2004 || Haleakala || NEAT || EUN || align=right | 1.8 km || 
|-id=566 bgcolor=#d6d6d6
| 116566 ||  || — || January 27, 2004 || Anderson Mesa || LONEOS || — || align=right | 5.8 km || 
|-id=567 bgcolor=#C2FFFF
| 116567 ||  || — || January 27, 2004 || Socorro || LINEAR || L5 || align=right | 11 km || 
|-id=568 bgcolor=#d6d6d6
| 116568 ||  || — || January 27, 2004 || Socorro || LINEAR || — || align=right | 5.0 km || 
|-id=569 bgcolor=#d6d6d6
| 116569 ||  || — || January 22, 2004 || Socorro || LINEAR || — || align=right | 7.1 km || 
|-id=570 bgcolor=#fefefe
| 116570 ||  || — || January 23, 2004 || Anderson Mesa || LONEOS || FLO || align=right | 1.1 km || 
|-id=571 bgcolor=#fefefe
| 116571 ||  || — || January 23, 2004 || Socorro || LINEAR || V || align=right | 1.5 km || 
|-id=572 bgcolor=#d6d6d6
| 116572 ||  || — || January 23, 2004 || Anderson Mesa || LONEOS || — || align=right | 4.6 km || 
|-id=573 bgcolor=#fefefe
| 116573 ||  || — || January 23, 2004 || Socorro || LINEAR || FLO || align=right | 1.2 km || 
|-id=574 bgcolor=#fefefe
| 116574 ||  || — || January 24, 2004 || Socorro || LINEAR || NYS || align=right | 2.0 km || 
|-id=575 bgcolor=#fefefe
| 116575 ||  || — || January 24, 2004 || Socorro || LINEAR || NYS || align=right | 1.2 km || 
|-id=576 bgcolor=#fefefe
| 116576 ||  || — || January 24, 2004 || Socorro || LINEAR || NYS || align=right | 1.6 km || 
|-id=577 bgcolor=#fefefe
| 116577 ||  || — || January 24, 2004 || Socorro || LINEAR || V || align=right | 1.4 km || 
|-id=578 bgcolor=#E9E9E9
| 116578 ||  || — || January 26, 2004 || Anderson Mesa || LONEOS || GEF || align=right | 2.5 km || 
|-id=579 bgcolor=#fefefe
| 116579 ||  || — || January 26, 2004 || Anderson Mesa || LONEOS || CHL || align=right | 5.3 km || 
|-id=580 bgcolor=#E9E9E9
| 116580 ||  || — || January 27, 2004 || Anderson Mesa || LONEOS || — || align=right | 3.1 km || 
|-id=581 bgcolor=#d6d6d6
| 116581 ||  || — || January 27, 2004 || Anderson Mesa || LONEOS || LIX || align=right | 7.1 km || 
|-id=582 bgcolor=#E9E9E9
| 116582 ||  || — || January 27, 2004 || Anderson Mesa || LONEOS || — || align=right | 2.7 km || 
|-id=583 bgcolor=#E9E9E9
| 116583 ||  || — || January 28, 2004 || Socorro || LINEAR || — || align=right | 2.0 km || 
|-id=584 bgcolor=#E9E9E9
| 116584 ||  || — || January 28, 2004 || Socorro || LINEAR || — || align=right | 3.0 km || 
|-id=585 bgcolor=#d6d6d6
| 116585 ||  || — || January 27, 2004 || Catalina || CSS || — || align=right | 5.6 km || 
|-id=586 bgcolor=#E9E9E9
| 116586 ||  || — || January 26, 2004 || Anderson Mesa || LONEOS || — || align=right | 1.9 km || 
|-id=587 bgcolor=#d6d6d6
| 116587 ||  || — || January 26, 2004 || Anderson Mesa || LONEOS || HYG || align=right | 5.5 km || 
|-id=588 bgcolor=#fefefe
| 116588 ||  || — || January 27, 2004 || Kitt Peak || Spacewatch || V || align=right | 1.2 km || 
|-id=589 bgcolor=#d6d6d6
| 116589 ||  || — || January 27, 2004 || Kitt Peak || Spacewatch || LIX || align=right | 5.8 km || 
|-id=590 bgcolor=#E9E9E9
| 116590 ||  || — || January 28, 2004 || Socorro || LINEAR || — || align=right | 1.8 km || 
|-id=591 bgcolor=#fefefe
| 116591 ||  || — || January 29, 2004 || Socorro || LINEAR || NYS || align=right | 1.5 km || 
|-id=592 bgcolor=#fefefe
| 116592 ||  || — || January 30, 2004 || Catalina || CSS || H || align=right | 1.4 km || 
|-id=593 bgcolor=#E9E9E9
| 116593 ||  || — || January 23, 2004 || Socorro || LINEAR || — || align=right | 2.5 km || 
|-id=594 bgcolor=#d6d6d6
| 116594 ||  || — || January 23, 2004 || Socorro || LINEAR || EUP || align=right | 6.9 km || 
|-id=595 bgcolor=#d6d6d6
| 116595 ||  || — || January 23, 2004 || Socorro || LINEAR || — || align=right | 6.3 km || 
|-id=596 bgcolor=#d6d6d6
| 116596 ||  || — || January 24, 2004 || Socorro || LINEAR || — || align=right | 6.6 km || 
|-id=597 bgcolor=#d6d6d6
| 116597 ||  || — || January 24, 2004 || Socorro || LINEAR || KOR || align=right | 3.1 km || 
|-id=598 bgcolor=#d6d6d6
| 116598 ||  || — || January 24, 2004 || Socorro || LINEAR || — || align=right | 6.2 km || 
|-id=599 bgcolor=#E9E9E9
| 116599 ||  || — || January 26, 2004 || Anderson Mesa || LONEOS || — || align=right | 3.2 km || 
|-id=600 bgcolor=#E9E9E9
| 116600 ||  || — || January 26, 2004 || Anderson Mesa || LONEOS || — || align=right | 3.7 km || 
|}

116601–116700 

|-bgcolor=#E9E9E9
| 116601 ||  || — || January 26, 2004 || Anderson Mesa || LONEOS || — || align=right | 6.7 km || 
|-id=602 bgcolor=#fefefe
| 116602 ||  || — || January 28, 2004 || Catalina || CSS || — || align=right | 2.6 km || 
|-id=603 bgcolor=#E9E9E9
| 116603 ||  || — || January 28, 2004 || Catalina || CSS || HOF || align=right | 4.8 km || 
|-id=604 bgcolor=#fefefe
| 116604 ||  || — || January 28, 2004 || Catalina || CSS || — || align=right | 1.9 km || 
|-id=605 bgcolor=#E9E9E9
| 116605 ||  || — || January 28, 2004 || Catalina || CSS || — || align=right | 6.8 km || 
|-id=606 bgcolor=#E9E9E9
| 116606 ||  || — || January 28, 2004 || Catalina || CSS || — || align=right | 3.4 km || 
|-id=607 bgcolor=#fefefe
| 116607 ||  || — || January 28, 2004 || Catalina || CSS || — || align=right | 1.4 km || 
|-id=608 bgcolor=#d6d6d6
| 116608 ||  || — || January 29, 2004 || Socorro || LINEAR || EOS || align=right | 3.1 km || 
|-id=609 bgcolor=#fefefe
| 116609 ||  || — || January 29, 2004 || Catalina || CSS || — || align=right | 1.6 km || 
|-id=610 bgcolor=#fefefe
| 116610 ||  || — || January 28, 2004 || Socorro || LINEAR || V || align=right | 1.5 km || 
|-id=611 bgcolor=#fefefe
| 116611 ||  || — || January 29, 2004 || Socorro || LINEAR || FLO || align=right | 1.2 km || 
|-id=612 bgcolor=#d6d6d6
| 116612 ||  || — || January 29, 2004 || Socorro || LINEAR || — || align=right | 6.0 km || 
|-id=613 bgcolor=#fefefe
| 116613 ||  || — || January 29, 2004 || Anderson Mesa || LONEOS || V || align=right | 1.5 km || 
|-id=614 bgcolor=#fefefe
| 116614 ||  || — || January 29, 2004 || Anderson Mesa || LONEOS || V || align=right | 1.3 km || 
|-id=615 bgcolor=#fefefe
| 116615 ||  || — || January 30, 2004 || Catalina || CSS || H || align=right | 1.4 km || 
|-id=616 bgcolor=#d6d6d6
| 116616 ||  || — || January 30, 2004 || Catalina || CSS || — || align=right | 5.9 km || 
|-id=617 bgcolor=#d6d6d6
| 116617 ||  || — || January 30, 2004 || Catalina || CSS || AEG || align=right | 7.4 km || 
|-id=618 bgcolor=#d6d6d6
| 116618 ||  || — || January 27, 2004 || Catalina || CSS || — || align=right | 8.3 km || 
|-id=619 bgcolor=#E9E9E9
| 116619 ||  || — || January 29, 2004 || Socorro || LINEAR || — || align=right | 3.8 km || 
|-id=620 bgcolor=#fefefe
| 116620 ||  || — || January 29, 2004 || Socorro || LINEAR || — || align=right | 3.6 km || 
|-id=621 bgcolor=#fefefe
| 116621 ||  || — || January 29, 2004 || Socorro || LINEAR || — || align=right | 1.3 km || 
|-id=622 bgcolor=#d6d6d6
| 116622 ||  || — || January 29, 2004 || Catalina || CSS || — || align=right | 6.4 km || 
|-id=623 bgcolor=#fefefe
| 116623 ||  || — || January 29, 2004 || Catalina || CSS || V || align=right | 1.2 km || 
|-id=624 bgcolor=#E9E9E9
| 116624 ||  || — || January 30, 2004 || Anderson Mesa || LONEOS || — || align=right | 3.1 km || 
|-id=625 bgcolor=#d6d6d6
| 116625 ||  || — || January 30, 2004 || Catalina || CSS || ALA || align=right | 9.6 km || 
|-id=626 bgcolor=#E9E9E9
| 116626 ||  || — || January 30, 2004 || Anderson Mesa || LONEOS || — || align=right | 4.2 km || 
|-id=627 bgcolor=#d6d6d6
| 116627 ||  || — || January 31, 2004 || Socorro || LINEAR || — || align=right | 6.4 km || 
|-id=628 bgcolor=#d6d6d6
| 116628 ||  || — || January 28, 2004 || Socorro || LINEAR || EUP || align=right | 9.4 km || 
|-id=629 bgcolor=#d6d6d6
| 116629 ||  || — || January 30, 2004 || Catalina || CSS || TIR || align=right | 5.6 km || 
|-id=630 bgcolor=#d6d6d6
| 116630 ||  || — || January 18, 2004 || Palomar || NEAT || — || align=right | 5.7 km || 
|-id=631 bgcolor=#fefefe
| 116631 ||  || — || January 16, 2004 || Palomar || NEAT || FLO || align=right | 1.5 km || 
|-id=632 bgcolor=#d6d6d6
| 116632 ||  || — || January 19, 2004 || Kitt Peak || Spacewatch || — || align=right | 4.4 km || 
|-id=633 bgcolor=#d6d6d6
| 116633 ||  || — || January 16, 2004 || Palomar || NEAT || KAR || align=right | 2.2 km || 
|-id=634 bgcolor=#d6d6d6
| 116634 ||  || — || January 17, 2004 || Palomar || NEAT || KOR || align=right | 2.5 km || 
|-id=635 bgcolor=#E9E9E9
| 116635 ||  || — || January 18, 2004 || Palomar || NEAT || — || align=right | 3.9 km || 
|-id=636 bgcolor=#E9E9E9
| 116636 ||  || — || January 19, 2004 || Anderson Mesa || LONEOS || — || align=right | 2.6 km || 
|-id=637 bgcolor=#d6d6d6
| 116637 ||  || — || January 28, 2004 || Catalina || CSS || — || align=right | 4.1 km || 
|-id=638 bgcolor=#d6d6d6
| 116638 || 2004 CD || — || February 2, 2004 || Catalina || CSS || EUP || align=right | 7.5 km || 
|-id=639 bgcolor=#E9E9E9
| 116639 || 2004 CF || — || February 2, 2004 || Catalina || CSS || HNS || align=right | 3.0 km || 
|-id=640 bgcolor=#fefefe
| 116640 ||  || — || February 10, 2004 || Socorro || LINEAR || — || align=right | 4.4 km || 
|-id=641 bgcolor=#E9E9E9
| 116641 ||  || — || February 10, 2004 || Palomar || NEAT || EUN || align=right | 2.5 km || 
|-id=642 bgcolor=#fefefe
| 116642 ||  || — || February 10, 2004 || Palomar || NEAT || — || align=right | 1.1 km || 
|-id=643 bgcolor=#E9E9E9
| 116643 ||  || — || February 10, 2004 || Palomar || NEAT || HEN || align=right | 1.8 km || 
|-id=644 bgcolor=#d6d6d6
| 116644 ||  || — || February 11, 2004 || Palomar || NEAT || — || align=right | 4.5 km || 
|-id=645 bgcolor=#fefefe
| 116645 ||  || — || February 11, 2004 || Palomar || NEAT || NYS || align=right | 1.2 km || 
|-id=646 bgcolor=#fefefe
| 116646 ||  || — || February 11, 2004 || Anderson Mesa || LONEOS || NYS || align=right | 1.2 km || 
|-id=647 bgcolor=#E9E9E9
| 116647 ||  || — || February 11, 2004 || Anderson Mesa || LONEOS || — || align=right | 1.8 km || 
|-id=648 bgcolor=#fefefe
| 116648 ||  || — || February 11, 2004 || Anderson Mesa || LONEOS || NYS || align=right | 1.4 km || 
|-id=649 bgcolor=#E9E9E9
| 116649 ||  || — || February 10, 2004 || Catalina || CSS || — || align=right | 2.4 km || 
|-id=650 bgcolor=#E9E9E9
| 116650 ||  || — || February 11, 2004 || Anderson Mesa || LONEOS || — || align=right | 3.5 km || 
|-id=651 bgcolor=#d6d6d6
| 116651 ||  || — || February 12, 2004 || Nogales || Tenagra II Obs. || CHA || align=right | 4.1 km || 
|-id=652 bgcolor=#fefefe
| 116652 ||  || — || February 12, 2004 || Palomar || NEAT || FLO || align=right | 1.2 km || 
|-id=653 bgcolor=#d6d6d6
| 116653 ||  || — || February 12, 2004 || Kitt Peak || Spacewatch || KAR || align=right | 2.1 km || 
|-id=654 bgcolor=#E9E9E9
| 116654 ||  || — || February 12, 2004 || Kitt Peak || Spacewatch || HNA || align=right | 4.8 km || 
|-id=655 bgcolor=#fefefe
| 116655 ||  || — || February 12, 2004 || Kitt Peak || Spacewatch || FLO || align=right | 1.1 km || 
|-id=656 bgcolor=#fefefe
| 116656 ||  || — || February 11, 2004 || Palomar || NEAT || — || align=right | 1.3 km || 
|-id=657 bgcolor=#d6d6d6
| 116657 ||  || — || February 12, 2004 || Kitt Peak || Spacewatch || — || align=right | 5.2 km || 
|-id=658 bgcolor=#E9E9E9
| 116658 ||  || — || February 12, 2004 || Palomar || NEAT || MAR || align=right | 3.1 km || 
|-id=659 bgcolor=#d6d6d6
| 116659 ||  || — || February 12, 2004 || Desert Eagle || W. K. Y. Yeung || — || align=right | 5.1 km || 
|-id=660 bgcolor=#fefefe
| 116660 ||  || — || February 13, 2004 || Desert Eagle || W. K. Y. Yeung || — || align=right | 1.8 km || 
|-id=661 bgcolor=#E9E9E9
| 116661 ||  || — || February 10, 2004 || Catalina || CSS || — || align=right | 4.1 km || 
|-id=662 bgcolor=#E9E9E9
| 116662 ||  || — || February 12, 2004 || Desert Eagle || W. K. Y. Yeung || — || align=right | 5.7 km || 
|-id=663 bgcolor=#d6d6d6
| 116663 ||  || — || February 11, 2004 || Palomar || NEAT || — || align=right | 3.6 km || 
|-id=664 bgcolor=#fefefe
| 116664 ||  || — || February 12, 2004 || Kitt Peak || Spacewatch || V || align=right | 1.4 km || 
|-id=665 bgcolor=#E9E9E9
| 116665 ||  || — || February 12, 2004 || Palomar || NEAT || AER || align=right | 2.2 km || 
|-id=666 bgcolor=#fefefe
| 116666 ||  || — || February 12, 2004 || Kitt Peak || Spacewatch || — || align=right | 2.0 km || 
|-id=667 bgcolor=#d6d6d6
| 116667 ||  || — || February 14, 2004 || Palomar || NEAT || TIR || align=right | 6.2 km || 
|-id=668 bgcolor=#fefefe
| 116668 ||  || — || February 11, 2004 || Kitt Peak || Spacewatch || — || align=right | 1.2 km || 
|-id=669 bgcolor=#E9E9E9
| 116669 ||  || — || February 13, 2004 || Kitt Peak || Spacewatch || — || align=right | 2.9 km || 
|-id=670 bgcolor=#d6d6d6
| 116670 ||  || — || February 15, 2004 || Haleakala || NEAT || — || align=right | 4.7 km || 
|-id=671 bgcolor=#fefefe
| 116671 ||  || — || February 11, 2004 || Kitt Peak || Spacewatch || — || align=right | 2.7 km || 
|-id=672 bgcolor=#fefefe
| 116672 ||  || — || February 10, 2004 || Palomar || NEAT || PHO || align=right | 2.2 km || 
|-id=673 bgcolor=#fefefe
| 116673 ||  || — || February 11, 2004 || Palomar || NEAT || — || align=right | 1.6 km || 
|-id=674 bgcolor=#E9E9E9
| 116674 ||  || — || February 11, 2004 || Kitt Peak || Spacewatch || — || align=right | 2.2 km || 
|-id=675 bgcolor=#d6d6d6
| 116675 ||  || — || February 14, 2004 || Kitt Peak || Spacewatch || — || align=right | 4.9 km || 
|-id=676 bgcolor=#E9E9E9
| 116676 ||  || — || February 15, 2004 || Socorro || LINEAR || — || align=right | 2.5 km || 
|-id=677 bgcolor=#fefefe
| 116677 ||  || — || February 10, 2004 || Catalina || CSS || — || align=right | 1.5 km || 
|-id=678 bgcolor=#fefefe
| 116678 ||  || — || February 10, 2004 || Palomar || NEAT || MAS || align=right | 1.3 km || 
|-id=679 bgcolor=#fefefe
| 116679 ||  || — || February 11, 2004 || Kitt Peak || Spacewatch || — || align=right | 1.5 km || 
|-id=680 bgcolor=#E9E9E9
| 116680 ||  || — || February 11, 2004 || Palomar || NEAT || — || align=right | 2.3 km || 
|-id=681 bgcolor=#d6d6d6
| 116681 ||  || — || February 11, 2004 || Palomar || NEAT || CRO || align=right | 6.3 km || 
|-id=682 bgcolor=#fefefe
| 116682 ||  || — || February 12, 2004 || Kitt Peak || Spacewatch || — || align=right | 1.2 km || 
|-id=683 bgcolor=#d6d6d6
| 116683 ||  || — || February 13, 2004 || Palomar || NEAT || EOS || align=right | 4.7 km || 
|-id=684 bgcolor=#E9E9E9
| 116684 ||  || — || February 13, 2004 || Kitt Peak || Spacewatch || — || align=right | 2.5 km || 
|-id=685 bgcolor=#E9E9E9
| 116685 ||  || — || February 11, 2004 || Palomar || NEAT || WIT || align=right | 1.8 km || 
|-id=686 bgcolor=#d6d6d6
| 116686 ||  || — || February 11, 2004 || Palomar || NEAT || KOR || align=right | 2.4 km || 
|-id=687 bgcolor=#fefefe
| 116687 ||  || — || February 11, 2004 || Anderson Mesa || LONEOS || NYS || align=right | 1.6 km || 
|-id=688 bgcolor=#fefefe
| 116688 ||  || — || February 11, 2004 || Palomar || NEAT || NYS || align=right | 1.8 km || 
|-id=689 bgcolor=#E9E9E9
| 116689 ||  || — || February 12, 2004 || Kitt Peak || Spacewatch || — || align=right | 2.0 km || 
|-id=690 bgcolor=#d6d6d6
| 116690 ||  || — || February 12, 2004 || Kitt Peak || Spacewatch || — || align=right | 6.2 km || 
|-id=691 bgcolor=#fefefe
| 116691 ||  || — || February 12, 2004 || Kitt Peak || Spacewatch || — || align=right | 1.1 km || 
|-id=692 bgcolor=#d6d6d6
| 116692 ||  || — || February 13, 2004 || Kitt Peak || Spacewatch || — || align=right | 4.8 km || 
|-id=693 bgcolor=#E9E9E9
| 116693 ||  || — || February 13, 2004 || Kitt Peak || Spacewatch || MAR || align=right | 1.7 km || 
|-id=694 bgcolor=#d6d6d6
| 116694 ||  || — || February 14, 2004 || Kitt Peak || Spacewatch || — || align=right | 8.2 km || 
|-id=695 bgcolor=#d6d6d6
| 116695 ||  || — || February 13, 2004 || Palomar || NEAT || — || align=right | 11 km || 
|-id=696 bgcolor=#fefefe
| 116696 ||  || — || February 14, 2004 || Socorro || LINEAR || V || align=right | 1.2 km || 
|-id=697 bgcolor=#E9E9E9
| 116697 ||  || — || February 14, 2004 || Haleakala || NEAT || — || align=right | 1.9 km || 
|-id=698 bgcolor=#fefefe
| 116698 ||  || — || February 14, 2004 || Socorro || LINEAR || — || align=right | 2.1 km || 
|-id=699 bgcolor=#E9E9E9
| 116699 ||  || — || February 14, 2004 || Catalina || CSS || — || align=right | 3.7 km || 
|-id=700 bgcolor=#d6d6d6
| 116700 ||  || — || February 15, 2004 || Catalina || CSS || — || align=right | 5.9 km || 
|}

116701–116800 

|-bgcolor=#fefefe
| 116701 ||  || — || February 15, 2004 || Catalina || CSS || NYS || align=right | 1.3 km || 
|-id=702 bgcolor=#E9E9E9
| 116702 ||  || — || February 12, 2004 || Palomar || NEAT || — || align=right | 2.4 km || 
|-id=703 bgcolor=#d6d6d6
| 116703 ||  || — || February 12, 2004 || Palomar || NEAT || — || align=right | 4.3 km || 
|-id=704 bgcolor=#d6d6d6
| 116704 ||  || — || February 12, 2004 || Palomar || NEAT || — || align=right | 5.4 km || 
|-id=705 bgcolor=#d6d6d6
| 116705 ||  || — || February 12, 2004 || Palomar || NEAT || TEL || align=right | 3.7 km || 
|-id=706 bgcolor=#E9E9E9
| 116706 ||  || — || February 12, 2004 || Palomar || NEAT || ADE || align=right | 3.8 km || 
|-id=707 bgcolor=#fefefe
| 116707 ||  || — || February 14, 2004 || Palomar || NEAT || V || align=right | 1.3 km || 
|-id=708 bgcolor=#d6d6d6
| 116708 ||  || — || February 13, 2004 || Anderson Mesa || LONEOS || — || align=right | 4.0 km || 
|-id=709 bgcolor=#d6d6d6
| 116709 ||  || — || February 13, 2004 || Anderson Mesa || LONEOS || — || align=right | 3.8 km || 
|-id=710 bgcolor=#E9E9E9
| 116710 ||  || — || February 13, 2004 || Anderson Mesa || LONEOS || — || align=right | 3.4 km || 
|-id=711 bgcolor=#d6d6d6
| 116711 ||  || — || February 16, 2004 || Socorro || LINEAR || EOS || align=right | 3.3 km || 
|-id=712 bgcolor=#d6d6d6
| 116712 ||  || — || February 16, 2004 || Socorro || LINEAR || — || align=right | 6.3 km || 
|-id=713 bgcolor=#d6d6d6
| 116713 ||  || — || February 16, 2004 || Socorro || LINEAR || — || align=right | 5.6 km || 
|-id=714 bgcolor=#E9E9E9
| 116714 ||  || — || February 16, 2004 || Kitt Peak || Spacewatch || — || align=right | 4.8 km || 
|-id=715 bgcolor=#fefefe
| 116715 ||  || — || February 16, 2004 || Kitt Peak || Spacewatch || FLO || align=right | 3.5 km || 
|-id=716 bgcolor=#d6d6d6
| 116716 ||  || — || February 17, 2004 || Desert Eagle || W. K. Y. Yeung || — || align=right | 7.5 km || 
|-id=717 bgcolor=#fefefe
| 116717 ||  || — || February 17, 2004 || Kitt Peak || Spacewatch || SUL || align=right | 3.5 km || 
|-id=718 bgcolor=#fefefe
| 116718 ||  || — || February 17, 2004 || Kitt Peak || Spacewatch || MAS || align=right | 1.5 km || 
|-id=719 bgcolor=#fefefe
| 116719 ||  || — || February 18, 2004 || Desert Eagle || W. K. Y. Yeung || — || align=right | 1.6 km || 
|-id=720 bgcolor=#fefefe
| 116720 ||  || — || February 16, 2004 || Kitt Peak || Spacewatch || MAS || align=right | 1.2 km || 
|-id=721 bgcolor=#fefefe
| 116721 ||  || — || February 17, 2004 || Kitt Peak || Spacewatch || — || align=right | 1.9 km || 
|-id=722 bgcolor=#fefefe
| 116722 ||  || — || February 16, 2004 || Catalina || CSS || — || align=right | 1.4 km || 
|-id=723 bgcolor=#fefefe
| 116723 ||  || — || February 16, 2004 || Catalina || CSS || V || align=right | 1.3 km || 
|-id=724 bgcolor=#fefefe
| 116724 ||  || — || February 16, 2004 || Catalina || CSS || — || align=right | 2.8 km || 
|-id=725 bgcolor=#fefefe
| 116725 ||  || — || February 16, 2004 || Catalina || CSS || V || align=right | 1.7 km || 
|-id=726 bgcolor=#fefefe
| 116726 ||  || — || February 16, 2004 || Catalina || CSS || — || align=right | 1.6 km || 
|-id=727 bgcolor=#fefefe
| 116727 ||  || — || February 17, 2004 || Haleakala || NEAT || V || align=right | 1.3 km || 
|-id=728 bgcolor=#fefefe
| 116728 ||  || — || February 17, 2004 || Catalina || CSS || — || align=right | 3.1 km || 
|-id=729 bgcolor=#d6d6d6
| 116729 ||  || — || February 18, 2004 || Socorro || LINEAR || — || align=right | 5.4 km || 
|-id=730 bgcolor=#E9E9E9
| 116730 ||  || — || February 18, 2004 || Catalina || CSS || HNS || align=right | 2.4 km || 
|-id=731 bgcolor=#fefefe
| 116731 ||  || — || February 19, 2004 || Socorro || LINEAR || — || align=right | 1.6 km || 
|-id=732 bgcolor=#fefefe
| 116732 ||  || — || February 19, 2004 || Socorro || LINEAR || NYS || align=right | 1.1 km || 
|-id=733 bgcolor=#d6d6d6
| 116733 ||  || — || February 16, 2004 || Socorro || LINEAR || — || align=right | 5.6 km || 
|-id=734 bgcolor=#fefefe
| 116734 ||  || — || February 18, 2004 || Catalina || CSS || V || align=right | 1.4 km || 
|-id=735 bgcolor=#fefefe
| 116735 ||  || — || February 19, 2004 || Socorro || LINEAR || — || align=right | 4.6 km || 
|-id=736 bgcolor=#fefefe
| 116736 ||  || — || February 19, 2004 || Socorro || LINEAR || V || align=right | 1.5 km || 
|-id=737 bgcolor=#E9E9E9
| 116737 ||  || — || February 19, 2004 || Socorro || LINEAR || ADE || align=right | 5.1 km || 
|-id=738 bgcolor=#fefefe
| 116738 ||  || — || February 19, 2004 || Socorro || LINEAR || — || align=right | 1.6 km || 
|-id=739 bgcolor=#fefefe
| 116739 ||  || — || February 19, 2004 || Socorro || LINEAR || V || align=right | 1.3 km || 
|-id=740 bgcolor=#fefefe
| 116740 ||  || — || February 19, 2004 || Socorro || LINEAR || H || align=right | 1.2 km || 
|-id=741 bgcolor=#fefefe
| 116741 ||  || — || February 26, 2004 || Desert Eagle || W. K. Y. Yeung || — || align=right | 1.6 km || 
|-id=742 bgcolor=#E9E9E9
| 116742 ||  || — || February 19, 2004 || Socorro || LINEAR || — || align=right | 3.7 km || 
|-id=743 bgcolor=#fefefe
| 116743 ||  || — || February 19, 2004 || Socorro || LINEAR || — || align=right | 1.7 km || 
|-id=744 bgcolor=#fefefe
| 116744 ||  || — || February 19, 2004 || Socorro || LINEAR || V || align=right | 1.3 km || 
|-id=745 bgcolor=#fefefe
| 116745 ||  || — || February 19, 2004 || Socorro || LINEAR || — || align=right | 1.5 km || 
|-id=746 bgcolor=#fefefe
| 116746 ||  || — || February 19, 2004 || Socorro || LINEAR || — || align=right | 1.6 km || 
|-id=747 bgcolor=#fefefe
| 116747 ||  || — || February 23, 2004 || Socorro || LINEAR || FLO || align=right | 1.4 km || 
|-id=748 bgcolor=#E9E9E9
| 116748 ||  || — || February 23, 2004 || Socorro || LINEAR || GEF || align=right | 2.1 km || 
|-id=749 bgcolor=#fefefe
| 116749 ||  || — || February 25, 2004 || Socorro || LINEAR || — || align=right | 1.3 km || 
|-id=750 bgcolor=#E9E9E9
| 116750 ||  || — || February 25, 2004 || Socorro || LINEAR || — || align=right | 1.7 km || 
|-id=751 bgcolor=#E9E9E9
| 116751 ||  || — || February 25, 2004 || Socorro || LINEAR || — || align=right | 2.0 km || 
|-id=752 bgcolor=#fefefe
| 116752 ||  || — || February 25, 2004 || Socorro || LINEAR || — || align=right | 1.9 km || 
|-id=753 bgcolor=#fefefe
| 116753 ||  || — || February 26, 2004 || Socorro || LINEAR || NYS || align=right | 1.5 km || 
|-id=754 bgcolor=#fefefe
| 116754 ||  || — || February 26, 2004 || Socorro || LINEAR || — || align=right | 1.3 km || 
|-id=755 bgcolor=#fefefe
| 116755 ||  || — || February 23, 2004 || Socorro || LINEAR || V || align=right | 1.2 km || 
|-id=756 bgcolor=#d6d6d6
| 116756 ||  || — || February 17, 2004 || Kitt Peak || Spacewatch || — || align=right | 3.7 km || 
|-id=757 bgcolor=#fefefe
| 116757 ||  || — || March 14, 2004 || Socorro || LINEAR || H || align=right | 1.3 km || 
|-id=758 bgcolor=#fefefe
| 116758 ||  || — || March 10, 2004 || Palomar || NEAT || — || align=right | 1.5 km || 
|-id=759 bgcolor=#fefefe
| 116759 ||  || — || March 11, 2004 || Palomar || NEAT || — || align=right | 3.3 km || 
|-id=760 bgcolor=#d6d6d6
| 116760 ||  || — || March 11, 2004 || Palomar || NEAT || — || align=right | 4.9 km || 
|-id=761 bgcolor=#fefefe
| 116761 ||  || — || March 12, 2004 || Palomar || NEAT || NYS || align=right | 1.1 km || 
|-id=762 bgcolor=#d6d6d6
| 116762 ||  || — || March 12, 2004 || Palomar || NEAT || — || align=right | 5.4 km || 
|-id=763 bgcolor=#E9E9E9
| 116763 ||  || — || March 13, 2004 || Palomar || NEAT || — || align=right | 3.0 km || 
|-id=764 bgcolor=#fefefe
| 116764 ||  || — || March 13, 2004 || Palomar || NEAT || FLO || align=right | 2.2 km || 
|-id=765 bgcolor=#fefefe
| 116765 ||  || — || March 13, 2004 || Palomar || NEAT || V || align=right | 1.2 km || 
|-id=766 bgcolor=#fefefe
| 116766 ||  || — || March 14, 2004 || Kitt Peak || Spacewatch || — || align=right | 1.5 km || 
|-id=767 bgcolor=#E9E9E9
| 116767 ||  || — || March 10, 2004 || Haleakala || NEAT || — || align=right | 3.9 km || 
|-id=768 bgcolor=#fefefe
| 116768 ||  || — || March 11, 2004 || Palomar || NEAT || — || align=right | 1.3 km || 
|-id=769 bgcolor=#fefefe
| 116769 ||  || — || March 11, 2004 || Palomar || NEAT || V || align=right | 1.4 km || 
|-id=770 bgcolor=#E9E9E9
| 116770 ||  || — || March 11, 2004 || Palomar || NEAT || — || align=right | 2.7 km || 
|-id=771 bgcolor=#E9E9E9
| 116771 ||  || — || March 12, 2004 || Palomar || NEAT || — || align=right | 3.0 km || 
|-id=772 bgcolor=#d6d6d6
| 116772 ||  || — || March 12, 2004 || Palomar || NEAT || — || align=right | 6.0 km || 
|-id=773 bgcolor=#E9E9E9
| 116773 ||  || — || March 12, 2004 || Palomar || NEAT || EUN || align=right | 2.1 km || 
|-id=774 bgcolor=#d6d6d6
| 116774 ||  || — || March 14, 2004 || Catalina || CSS || — || align=right | 4.6 km || 
|-id=775 bgcolor=#fefefe
| 116775 ||  || — || March 15, 2004 || Desert Eagle || W. K. Y. Yeung || — || align=right | 1.4 km || 
|-id=776 bgcolor=#E9E9E9
| 116776 ||  || — || March 14, 2004 || Catalina || CSS || — || align=right | 4.1 km || 
|-id=777 bgcolor=#d6d6d6
| 116777 ||  || — || March 15, 2004 || Goodricke-Pigott || Goodricke-Pigott Obs. || — || align=right | 6.1 km || 
|-id=778 bgcolor=#d6d6d6
| 116778 ||  || — || March 13, 2004 || Palomar || NEAT || 615 || align=right | 2.6 km || 
|-id=779 bgcolor=#E9E9E9
| 116779 ||  || — || March 15, 2004 || Kitt Peak || Spacewatch || — || align=right | 2.4 km || 
|-id=780 bgcolor=#fefefe
| 116780 ||  || — || March 13, 2004 || Palomar || NEAT || — || align=right | 2.0 km || 
|-id=781 bgcolor=#E9E9E9
| 116781 ||  || — || March 14, 2004 || Palomar || NEAT || — || align=right | 2.3 km || 
|-id=782 bgcolor=#E9E9E9
| 116782 ||  || — || March 14, 2004 || Palomar || NEAT || ADE || align=right | 3.3 km || 
|-id=783 bgcolor=#fefefe
| 116783 ||  || — || March 14, 2004 || Palomar || NEAT || — || align=right | 1.6 km || 
|-id=784 bgcolor=#d6d6d6
| 116784 ||  || — || March 12, 2004 || Palomar || NEAT || 3:2 || align=right | 7.8 km || 
|-id=785 bgcolor=#E9E9E9
| 116785 ||  || — || March 12, 2004 || Palomar || NEAT || — || align=right | 3.9 km || 
|-id=786 bgcolor=#fefefe
| 116786 ||  || — || March 12, 2004 || Palomar || NEAT || NYS || align=right | 1.1 km || 
|-id=787 bgcolor=#fefefe
| 116787 ||  || — || March 12, 2004 || Palomar || NEAT || — || align=right | 1.5 km || 
|-id=788 bgcolor=#fefefe
| 116788 ||  || — || March 12, 2004 || Palomar || NEAT || — || align=right | 2.4 km || 
|-id=789 bgcolor=#d6d6d6
| 116789 ||  || — || March 14, 2004 || Kitt Peak || Spacewatch || TIR || align=right | 2.8 km || 
|-id=790 bgcolor=#fefefe
| 116790 ||  || — || March 14, 2004 || Catalina || CSS || FLO || align=right | 3.0 km || 
|-id=791 bgcolor=#fefefe
| 116791 ||  || — || March 15, 2004 || Kitt Peak || Spacewatch || V || align=right | 1.4 km || 
|-id=792 bgcolor=#fefefe
| 116792 ||  || — || March 15, 2004 || Catalina || CSS || — || align=right | 1.7 km || 
|-id=793 bgcolor=#d6d6d6
| 116793 ||  || — || March 15, 2004 || Kitt Peak || Spacewatch || EOS || align=right | 4.1 km || 
|-id=794 bgcolor=#d6d6d6
| 116794 ||  || — || March 15, 2004 || Socorro || LINEAR || — || align=right | 6.8 km || 
|-id=795 bgcolor=#d6d6d6
| 116795 ||  || — || March 15, 2004 || Catalina || CSS || — || align=right | 3.9 km || 
|-id=796 bgcolor=#fefefe
| 116796 ||  || — || March 15, 2004 || Kitt Peak || Spacewatch || FLO || align=right | 1.2 km || 
|-id=797 bgcolor=#E9E9E9
| 116797 ||  || — || March 15, 2004 || Palomar || NEAT || — || align=right | 3.5 km || 
|-id=798 bgcolor=#E9E9E9
| 116798 ||  || — || March 15, 2004 || Palomar || NEAT || — || align=right | 4.9 km || 
|-id=799 bgcolor=#E9E9E9
| 116799 ||  || — || March 15, 2004 || Palomar || NEAT || BRG || align=right | 3.0 km || 
|-id=800 bgcolor=#fefefe
| 116800 ||  || — || March 15, 2004 || Palomar || NEAT || — || align=right | 1.8 km || 
|}

116801–116900 

|-bgcolor=#fefefe
| 116801 ||  || — || March 13, 2004 || Palomar || NEAT || V || align=right data-sort-value="0.96" | 960 m || 
|-id=802 bgcolor=#d6d6d6
| 116802 ||  || — || March 14, 2004 || Socorro || LINEAR || — || align=right | 7.7 km || 
|-id=803 bgcolor=#fefefe
| 116803 ||  || — || March 15, 2004 || Socorro || LINEAR || — || align=right | 2.0 km || 
|-id=804 bgcolor=#E9E9E9
| 116804 ||  || — || March 15, 2004 || Kitt Peak || Spacewatch || — || align=right | 3.6 km || 
|-id=805 bgcolor=#fefefe
| 116805 ||  || — || March 15, 2004 || Catalina || CSS || NYS || align=right | 3.1 km || 
|-id=806 bgcolor=#fefefe
| 116806 ||  || — || March 15, 2004 || Catalina || CSS || — || align=right | 1.6 km || 
|-id=807 bgcolor=#E9E9E9
| 116807 ||  || — || March 15, 2004 || Catalina || CSS || — || align=right | 2.7 km || 
|-id=808 bgcolor=#fefefe
| 116808 ||  || — || March 15, 2004 || Catalina || CSS || — || align=right | 1.5 km || 
|-id=809 bgcolor=#fefefe
| 116809 ||  || — || March 15, 2004 || Kitt Peak || Spacewatch || — || align=right | 1.8 km || 
|-id=810 bgcolor=#fefefe
| 116810 ||  || — || March 15, 2004 || Catalina || CSS || V || align=right | 1.3 km || 
|-id=811 bgcolor=#fefefe
| 116811 ||  || — || March 15, 2004 || Socorro || LINEAR || NYS || align=right | 1.7 km || 
|-id=812 bgcolor=#fefefe
| 116812 ||  || — || March 15, 2004 || Socorro || LINEAR || ERI || align=right | 3.5 km || 
|-id=813 bgcolor=#E9E9E9
| 116813 ||  || — || March 14, 2004 || Socorro || LINEAR || — || align=right | 1.8 km || 
|-id=814 bgcolor=#d6d6d6
| 116814 ||  || — || March 14, 2004 || Socorro || LINEAR || — || align=right | 6.3 km || 
|-id=815 bgcolor=#fefefe
| 116815 ||  || — || March 14, 2004 || Socorro || LINEAR || — || align=right | 2.6 km || 
|-id=816 bgcolor=#fefefe
| 116816 ||  || — || March 14, 2004 || Palomar || NEAT || NYS || align=right | 1.1 km || 
|-id=817 bgcolor=#fefefe
| 116817 ||  || — || March 15, 2004 || Kitt Peak || Spacewatch || — || align=right | 1.5 km || 
|-id=818 bgcolor=#E9E9E9
| 116818 ||  || — || March 15, 2004 || Socorro || LINEAR || — || align=right | 5.8 km || 
|-id=819 bgcolor=#fefefe
| 116819 || 2004 FM || — || March 16, 2004 || Socorro || LINEAR || H || align=right | 1.5 km || 
|-id=820 bgcolor=#fefefe
| 116820 || 2004 FO || — || March 16, 2004 || Catalina || CSS || H || align=right | 1.6 km || 
|-id=821 bgcolor=#E9E9E9
| 116821 ||  || — || March 16, 2004 || Catalina || CSS || KON || align=right | 4.2 km || 
|-id=822 bgcolor=#fefefe
| 116822 ||  || — || March 16, 2004 || Catalina || CSS || — || align=right | 1.7 km || 
|-id=823 bgcolor=#fefefe
| 116823 ||  || — || March 16, 2004 || Catalina || CSS || V || align=right | 1.2 km || 
|-id=824 bgcolor=#fefefe
| 116824 ||  || — || March 16, 2004 || Catalina || CSS || — || align=right | 1.4 km || 
|-id=825 bgcolor=#d6d6d6
| 116825 ||  || — || March 16, 2004 || Kitt Peak || Spacewatch || — || align=right | 4.7 km || 
|-id=826 bgcolor=#fefefe
| 116826 ||  || — || March 26, 2004 || Socorro || LINEAR || H || align=right | 1.7 km || 
|-id=827 bgcolor=#fefefe
| 116827 ||  || — || March 26, 2004 || Socorro || LINEAR || H || align=right | 1.1 km || 
|-id=828 bgcolor=#E9E9E9
| 116828 ||  || — || March 16, 2004 || Socorro || LINEAR || MAR || align=right | 2.0 km || 
|-id=829 bgcolor=#fefefe
| 116829 ||  || — || March 17, 2004 || Socorro || LINEAR || — || align=right | 1.5 km || 
|-id=830 bgcolor=#d6d6d6
| 116830 ||  || — || March 17, 2004 || Socorro || LINEAR || — || align=right | 7.1 km || 
|-id=831 bgcolor=#E9E9E9
| 116831 ||  || — || March 29, 2004 || Socorro || LINEAR || BRU || align=right | 7.2 km || 
|-id=832 bgcolor=#d6d6d6
| 116832 ||  || — || March 16, 2004 || Kitt Peak || Spacewatch || VER || align=right | 6.0 km || 
|-id=833 bgcolor=#E9E9E9
| 116833 ||  || — || March 16, 2004 || Kitt Peak || Spacewatch || EUN || align=right | 3.4 km || 
|-id=834 bgcolor=#E9E9E9
| 116834 ||  || — || March 16, 2004 || Socorro || LINEAR || — || align=right | 2.7 km || 
|-id=835 bgcolor=#E9E9E9
| 116835 ||  || — || March 16, 2004 || Socorro || LINEAR || AGN || align=right | 2.6 km || 
|-id=836 bgcolor=#E9E9E9
| 116836 ||  || — || March 17, 2004 || Socorro || LINEAR || — || align=right | 1.8 km || 
|-id=837 bgcolor=#E9E9E9
| 116837 ||  || — || March 17, 2004 || Socorro || LINEAR || — || align=right | 1.9 km || 
|-id=838 bgcolor=#fefefe
| 116838 ||  || — || March 17, 2004 || Socorro || LINEAR || — || align=right | 1.8 km || 
|-id=839 bgcolor=#d6d6d6
| 116839 ||  || — || March 17, 2004 || Socorro || LINEAR || — || align=right | 5.6 km || 
|-id=840 bgcolor=#E9E9E9
| 116840 ||  || — || March 17, 2004 || Socorro || LINEAR || — || align=right | 3.5 km || 
|-id=841 bgcolor=#fefefe
| 116841 ||  || — || March 17, 2004 || Catalina || CSS || FLO || align=right | 1.6 km || 
|-id=842 bgcolor=#E9E9E9
| 116842 ||  || — || March 18, 2004 || Kitt Peak || Spacewatch || NEM || align=right | 3.5 km || 
|-id=843 bgcolor=#fefefe
| 116843 ||  || — || March 16, 2004 || Socorro || LINEAR || — || align=right | 2.0 km || 
|-id=844 bgcolor=#fefefe
| 116844 ||  || — || March 18, 2004 || Socorro || LINEAR || V || align=right | 1.4 km || 
|-id=845 bgcolor=#fefefe
| 116845 ||  || — || March 18, 2004 || Socorro || LINEAR || — || align=right | 3.3 km || 
|-id=846 bgcolor=#fefefe
| 116846 ||  || — || March 18, 2004 || Socorro || LINEAR || V || align=right data-sort-value="0.96" | 960 m || 
|-id=847 bgcolor=#fefefe
| 116847 ||  || — || March 19, 2004 || Palomar || NEAT || FLO || align=right | 1.3 km || 
|-id=848 bgcolor=#E9E9E9
| 116848 ||  || — || March 19, 2004 || Socorro || LINEAR || JUN || align=right | 1.4 km || 
|-id=849 bgcolor=#fefefe
| 116849 ||  || — || March 19, 2004 || Socorro || LINEAR || — || align=right | 4.1 km || 
|-id=850 bgcolor=#d6d6d6
| 116850 ||  || — || March 18, 2004 || Kitt Peak || Spacewatch || — || align=right | 3.8 km || 
|-id=851 bgcolor=#fefefe
| 116851 ||  || — || March 19, 2004 || Socorro || LINEAR || FLO || align=right | 1.4 km || 
|-id=852 bgcolor=#E9E9E9
| 116852 ||  || — || March 19, 2004 || Socorro || LINEAR || — || align=right | 2.4 km || 
|-id=853 bgcolor=#E9E9E9
| 116853 ||  || — || March 19, 2004 || Socorro || LINEAR || — || align=right | 2.8 km || 
|-id=854 bgcolor=#E9E9E9
| 116854 ||  || — || March 19, 2004 || Socorro || LINEAR || RAF || align=right | 1.7 km || 
|-id=855 bgcolor=#fefefe
| 116855 ||  || — || March 20, 2004 || Socorro || LINEAR || V || align=right | 1.5 km || 
|-id=856 bgcolor=#fefefe
| 116856 ||  || — || March 18, 2004 || Socorro || LINEAR || NYS || align=right | 1.7 km || 
|-id=857 bgcolor=#E9E9E9
| 116857 ||  || — || March 19, 2004 || Socorro || LINEAR || HEN || align=right | 1.8 km || 
|-id=858 bgcolor=#E9E9E9
| 116858 ||  || — || March 18, 2004 || Kitt Peak || Spacewatch || MAR || align=right | 2.5 km || 
|-id=859 bgcolor=#E9E9E9
| 116859 ||  || — || March 20, 2004 || Socorro || LINEAR || — || align=right | 2.8 km || 
|-id=860 bgcolor=#E9E9E9
| 116860 ||  || — || March 20, 2004 || Socorro || LINEAR || — || align=right | 4.8 km || 
|-id=861 bgcolor=#d6d6d6
| 116861 ||  || — || March 20, 2004 || Siding Spring || SSS || — || align=right | 5.4 km || 
|-id=862 bgcolor=#fefefe
| 116862 ||  || — || March 23, 2004 || Socorro || LINEAR || — || align=right | 1.5 km || 
|-id=863 bgcolor=#fefefe
| 116863 ||  || — || March 18, 2004 || Socorro || LINEAR || — || align=right | 1.3 km || 
|-id=864 bgcolor=#d6d6d6
| 116864 ||  || — || March 20, 2004 || Socorro || LINEAR || — || align=right | 5.3 km || 
|-id=865 bgcolor=#fefefe
| 116865 ||  || — || March 23, 2004 || Socorro || LINEAR || — || align=right | 2.3 km || 
|-id=866 bgcolor=#fefefe
| 116866 ||  || — || March 20, 2004 || Socorro || LINEAR || — || align=right | 1.4 km || 
|-id=867 bgcolor=#fefefe
| 116867 ||  || — || March 24, 2004 || Anderson Mesa || LONEOS || — || align=right | 1.4 km || 
|-id=868 bgcolor=#E9E9E9
| 116868 ||  || — || March 24, 2004 || Siding Spring || SSS || HNS || align=right | 2.5 km || 
|-id=869 bgcolor=#d6d6d6
| 116869 ||  || — || March 24, 2004 || Siding Spring || SSS || — || align=right | 6.8 km || 
|-id=870 bgcolor=#E9E9E9
| 116870 ||  || — || March 25, 2004 || Socorro || LINEAR || — || align=right | 4.3 km || 
|-id=871 bgcolor=#d6d6d6
| 116871 ||  || — || March 20, 2004 || Socorro || LINEAR || — || align=right | 4.6 km || 
|-id=872 bgcolor=#fefefe
| 116872 ||  || — || March 23, 2004 || Kitt Peak || Spacewatch || MAS || align=right | 1.4 km || 
|-id=873 bgcolor=#E9E9E9
| 116873 ||  || — || March 23, 2004 || Kitt Peak || Spacewatch || — || align=right | 3.7 km || 
|-id=874 bgcolor=#d6d6d6
| 116874 ||  || — || March 24, 2004 || Anderson Mesa || LONEOS || — || align=right | 4.8 km || 
|-id=875 bgcolor=#fefefe
| 116875 ||  || — || March 24, 2004 || Anderson Mesa || LONEOS || — || align=right | 1.5 km || 
|-id=876 bgcolor=#E9E9E9
| 116876 ||  || — || March 25, 2004 || Anderson Mesa || LONEOS || — || align=right | 3.1 km || 
|-id=877 bgcolor=#fefefe
| 116877 ||  || — || March 26, 2004 || Socorro || LINEAR || V || align=right | 1.3 km || 
|-id=878 bgcolor=#d6d6d6
| 116878 ||  || — || March 21, 2004 || Kitt Peak || Spacewatch || — || align=right | 3.5 km || 
|-id=879 bgcolor=#d6d6d6
| 116879 ||  || — || March 21, 2004 || Kitt Peak || Spacewatch || KOR || align=right | 2.4 km || 
|-id=880 bgcolor=#d6d6d6
| 116880 ||  || — || March 23, 2004 || Socorro || LINEAR || LIX || align=right | 8.8 km || 
|-id=881 bgcolor=#d6d6d6
| 116881 ||  || — || March 23, 2004 || Socorro || LINEAR || LIX || align=right | 7.8 km || 
|-id=882 bgcolor=#d6d6d6
| 116882 ||  || — || March 22, 2004 || Socorro || LINEAR || EOS || align=right | 3.8 km || 
|-id=883 bgcolor=#d6d6d6
| 116883 ||  || — || March 23, 2004 || Socorro || LINEAR || THB || align=right | 6.1 km || 
|-id=884 bgcolor=#fefefe
| 116884 ||  || — || March 24, 2004 || Anderson Mesa || LONEOS || — || align=right | 5.5 km || 
|-id=885 bgcolor=#d6d6d6
| 116885 ||  || — || March 25, 2004 || Anderson Mesa || LONEOS || — || align=right | 5.3 km || 
|-id=886 bgcolor=#E9E9E9
| 116886 ||  || — || March 26, 2004 || Socorro || LINEAR || GER || align=right | 3.2 km || 
|-id=887 bgcolor=#E9E9E9
| 116887 ||  || — || March 26, 2004 || Kitt Peak || Spacewatch || — || align=right | 1.4 km || 
|-id=888 bgcolor=#E9E9E9
| 116888 ||  || — || March 26, 2004 || Catalina || CSS || — || align=right | 5.7 km || 
|-id=889 bgcolor=#E9E9E9
| 116889 ||  || — || March 27, 2004 || Socorro || LINEAR || MAR || align=right | 2.1 km || 
|-id=890 bgcolor=#fefefe
| 116890 ||  || — || March 27, 2004 || Socorro || LINEAR || — || align=right | 1.9 km || 
|-id=891 bgcolor=#d6d6d6
| 116891 ||  || — || March 27, 2004 || Catalina || CSS || — || align=right | 6.4 km || 
|-id=892 bgcolor=#fefefe
| 116892 ||  || — || March 23, 2004 || Kitt Peak || Spacewatch || FLO || align=right | 1.4 km || 
|-id=893 bgcolor=#E9E9E9
| 116893 ||  || — || March 28, 2004 || Socorro || LINEAR || DOR || align=right | 4.8 km || 
|-id=894 bgcolor=#d6d6d6
| 116894 ||  || — || March 19, 2004 || Socorro || LINEAR || THB || align=right | 6.5 km || 
|-id=895 bgcolor=#d6d6d6
| 116895 ||  || — || March 25, 2004 || Anderson Mesa || LONEOS || — || align=right | 3.3 km || 
|-id=896 bgcolor=#d6d6d6
| 116896 ||  || — || March 25, 2004 || Anderson Mesa || LONEOS || — || align=right | 3.6 km || 
|-id=897 bgcolor=#E9E9E9
| 116897 ||  || — || March 26, 2004 || Anderson Mesa || LONEOS || ADE || align=right | 4.0 km || 
|-id=898 bgcolor=#d6d6d6
| 116898 ||  || — || March 26, 2004 || Kitt Peak || Spacewatch || — || align=right | 3.2 km || 
|-id=899 bgcolor=#fefefe
| 116899 ||  || — || March 27, 2004 || Socorro || LINEAR || — || align=right | 1.5 km || 
|-id=900 bgcolor=#fefefe
| 116900 ||  || — || March 28, 2004 || Socorro || LINEAR || — || align=right | 3.2 km || 
|}

116901–117000 

|-bgcolor=#C2FFFF
| 116901 ||  || — || March 16, 2004 || Kitt Peak || Spacewatch || L4 || align=right | 17 km || 
|-id=902 bgcolor=#d6d6d6
| 116902 ||  || — || March 18, 2004 || Socorro || LINEAR || — || align=right | 4.9 km || 
|-id=903 bgcolor=#fefefe
| 116903 Jeromeapt || 2004 GW ||  || April 11, 2004 || Wrightwood || J. W. Young || MAS || align=right | 1.0 km || 
|-id=904 bgcolor=#fefefe
| 116904 ||  || — || April 8, 2004 || Palomar || NEAT || — || align=right | 2.1 km || 
|-id=905 bgcolor=#d6d6d6
| 116905 ||  || — || April 9, 2004 || Palomar || NEAT || BRA || align=right | 3.2 km || 
|-id=906 bgcolor=#fefefe
| 116906 ||  || — || April 11, 2004 || Catalina || CSS || — || align=right | 1.2 km || 
|-id=907 bgcolor=#fefefe
| 116907 ||  || — || April 10, 2004 || Reedy Creek || J. Broughton || PHO || align=right | 2.2 km || 
|-id=908 bgcolor=#d6d6d6
| 116908 ||  || — || April 12, 2004 || Socorro || LINEAR || 7:4* || align=right | 6.0 km || 
|-id=909 bgcolor=#fefefe
| 116909 ||  || — || April 9, 2004 || Siding Spring || SSS || — || align=right | 1.5 km || 
|-id=910 bgcolor=#fefefe
| 116910 ||  || — || April 10, 2004 || Palomar || NEAT || — || align=right | 1.8 km || 
|-id=911 bgcolor=#d6d6d6
| 116911 ||  || — || April 8, 2004 || Palomar || NEAT || — || align=right | 5.0 km || 
|-id=912 bgcolor=#E9E9E9
| 116912 ||  || — || April 12, 2004 || Siding Spring || SSS || — || align=right | 4.2 km || 
|-id=913 bgcolor=#fefefe
| 116913 ||  || — || April 11, 2004 || Palomar || NEAT || — || align=right | 1.9 km || 
|-id=914 bgcolor=#d6d6d6
| 116914 ||  || — || April 13, 2004 || Catalina || CSS || — || align=right | 6.2 km || 
|-id=915 bgcolor=#fefefe
| 116915 ||  || — || April 13, 2004 || Catalina || CSS || V || align=right | 1.4 km || 
|-id=916 bgcolor=#d6d6d6
| 116916 ||  || — || April 12, 2004 || Catalina || CSS || EUP || align=right | 7.9 km || 
|-id=917 bgcolor=#d6d6d6
| 116917 ||  || — || April 9, 2004 || Siding Spring || SSS || — || align=right | 6.8 km || 
|-id=918 bgcolor=#E9E9E9
| 116918 ||  || — || April 10, 2004 || Palomar || NEAT || — || align=right | 5.7 km || 
|-id=919 bgcolor=#d6d6d6
| 116919 ||  || — || April 12, 2004 || Anderson Mesa || LONEOS || — || align=right | 3.3 km || 
|-id=920 bgcolor=#E9E9E9
| 116920 ||  || — || April 13, 2004 || Catalina || CSS || — || align=right | 4.3 km || 
|-id=921 bgcolor=#d6d6d6
| 116921 ||  || — || April 13, 2004 || Catalina || CSS || HYG || align=right | 4.7 km || 
|-id=922 bgcolor=#E9E9E9
| 116922 ||  || — || April 13, 2004 || Kitt Peak || Spacewatch || — || align=right | 2.8 km || 
|-id=923 bgcolor=#d6d6d6
| 116923 ||  || — || April 14, 2004 || Anderson Mesa || LONEOS || — || align=right | 6.0 km || 
|-id=924 bgcolor=#fefefe
| 116924 ||  || — || April 14, 2004 || Anderson Mesa || LONEOS || V || align=right | 1.3 km || 
|-id=925 bgcolor=#d6d6d6
| 116925 ||  || — || April 14, 2004 || Anderson Mesa || LONEOS || — || align=right | 5.1 km || 
|-id=926 bgcolor=#d6d6d6
| 116926 ||  || — || April 14, 2004 || Anderson Mesa || LONEOS || — || align=right | 7.7 km || 
|-id=927 bgcolor=#d6d6d6
| 116927 ||  || — || April 14, 2004 || Palomar || NEAT || TIR || align=right | 3.5 km || 
|-id=928 bgcolor=#E9E9E9
| 116928 ||  || — || April 15, 2004 || Catalina || CSS || ADE || align=right | 4.7 km || 
|-id=929 bgcolor=#E9E9E9
| 116929 ||  || — || April 15, 2004 || Palomar || NEAT || — || align=right | 5.3 km || 
|-id=930 bgcolor=#C2FFFF
| 116930 ||  || — || April 11, 2004 || Catalina || CSS || L4 || align=right | 20 km || 
|-id=931 bgcolor=#E9E9E9
| 116931 ||  || — || April 12, 2004 || Palomar || NEAT || — || align=right | 3.6 km || 
|-id=932 bgcolor=#d6d6d6
| 116932 ||  || — || April 12, 2004 || Palomar || NEAT || — || align=right | 2.4 km || 
|-id=933 bgcolor=#E9E9E9
| 116933 ||  || — || April 12, 2004 || Palomar || NEAT || EUN || align=right | 2.6 km || 
|-id=934 bgcolor=#d6d6d6
| 116934 ||  || — || April 13, 2004 || Palomar || NEAT || HYG || align=right | 5.4 km || 
|-id=935 bgcolor=#fefefe
| 116935 ||  || — || April 13, 2004 || Palomar || NEAT || V || align=right | 1.6 km || 
|-id=936 bgcolor=#E9E9E9
| 116936 ||  || — || April 14, 2004 || Palomar || NEAT || — || align=right | 4.7 km || 
|-id=937 bgcolor=#fefefe
| 116937 ||  || — || April 15, 2004 || Catalina || CSS || V || align=right | 1.6 km || 
|-id=938 bgcolor=#fefefe
| 116938 ||  || — || April 15, 2004 || Catalina || CSS || FLO || align=right | 2.4 km || 
|-id=939 bgcolor=#fefefe
| 116939 Jonstewart ||  ||  || April 15, 2004 || Catalina || CSS || — || align=right | 1.8 km || 
|-id=940 bgcolor=#d6d6d6
| 116940 ||  || — || April 15, 2004 || Siding Spring || SSS || — || align=right | 5.7 km || 
|-id=941 bgcolor=#E9E9E9
| 116941 ||  || — || April 11, 2004 || Palomar || NEAT || — || align=right | 5.7 km || 
|-id=942 bgcolor=#E9E9E9
| 116942 ||  || — || April 12, 2004 || Siding Spring || SSS || ADE || align=right | 4.6 km || 
|-id=943 bgcolor=#d6d6d6
| 116943 ||  || — || April 15, 2004 || Socorro || LINEAR || — || align=right | 2.9 km || 
|-id=944 bgcolor=#fefefe
| 116944 ||  || — || April 12, 2004 || Kitt Peak || Spacewatch || — || align=right | 1.2 km || 
|-id=945 bgcolor=#E9E9E9
| 116945 ||  || — || April 12, 2004 || Kitt Peak || Spacewatch || — || align=right | 1.9 km || 
|-id=946 bgcolor=#fefefe
| 116946 ||  || — || April 12, 2004 || Kitt Peak || Spacewatch || V || align=right data-sort-value="0.94" | 940 m || 
|-id=947 bgcolor=#d6d6d6
| 116947 ||  || — || April 13, 2004 || Kitt Peak || Spacewatch || KOR || align=right | 1.9 km || 
|-id=948 bgcolor=#E9E9E9
| 116948 ||  || — || April 13, 2004 || Palomar || NEAT || GEF || align=right | 2.6 km || 
|-id=949 bgcolor=#E9E9E9
| 116949 ||  || — || April 11, 2004 || Catalina || CSS || — || align=right | 1.3 km || 
|-id=950 bgcolor=#d6d6d6
| 116950 ||  || — || April 15, 2004 || Socorro || LINEAR || BRA || align=right | 3.3 km || 
|-id=951 bgcolor=#E9E9E9
| 116951 ||  || — || April 15, 2004 || Socorro || LINEAR || — || align=right | 3.1 km || 
|-id=952 bgcolor=#d6d6d6
| 116952 ||  || — || April 15, 2004 || Socorro || LINEAR || 7:4 || align=right | 7.7 km || 
|-id=953 bgcolor=#E9E9E9
| 116953 ||  || — || April 15, 2004 || Siding Spring || SSS || — || align=right | 3.5 km || 
|-id=954 bgcolor=#C2FFFF
| 116954 ||  || — || April 20, 2004 || Desert Eagle || W. K. Y. Yeung || L4 || align=right | 14 km || 
|-id=955 bgcolor=#fefefe
| 116955 ||  || — || April 16, 2004 || Kitt Peak || Spacewatch || ERI || align=right | 3.2 km || 
|-id=956 bgcolor=#d6d6d6
| 116956 ||  || — || April 16, 2004 || Anderson Mesa || LONEOS || — || align=right | 7.1 km || 
|-id=957 bgcolor=#d6d6d6
| 116957 ||  || — || April 16, 2004 || Palomar || NEAT || — || align=right | 4.1 km || 
|-id=958 bgcolor=#E9E9E9
| 116958 ||  || — || April 17, 2004 || Socorro || LINEAR || — || align=right | 4.4 km || 
|-id=959 bgcolor=#E9E9E9
| 116959 ||  || — || April 17, 2004 || Socorro || LINEAR || — || align=right | 5.8 km || 
|-id=960 bgcolor=#fefefe
| 116960 ||  || — || April 17, 2004 || Socorro || LINEAR || V || align=right | 1.3 km || 
|-id=961 bgcolor=#E9E9E9
| 116961 ||  || — || April 17, 2004 || Socorro || LINEAR || ADE || align=right | 4.8 km || 
|-id=962 bgcolor=#E9E9E9
| 116962 ||  || — || April 17, 2004 || Socorro || LINEAR || HNA || align=right | 5.1 km || 
|-id=963 bgcolor=#E9E9E9
| 116963 ||  || — || April 16, 2004 || Kitt Peak || Spacewatch || — || align=right | 2.6 km || 
|-id=964 bgcolor=#d6d6d6
| 116964 ||  || — || April 16, 2004 || Socorro || LINEAR || — || align=right | 6.2 km || 
|-id=965 bgcolor=#fefefe
| 116965 ||  || — || April 16, 2004 || Palomar || NEAT || — || align=right | 2.2 km || 
|-id=966 bgcolor=#E9E9E9
| 116966 ||  || — || April 17, 2004 || Socorro || LINEAR || GEF || align=right | 2.5 km || 
|-id=967 bgcolor=#E9E9E9
| 116967 ||  || — || April 17, 2004 || Socorro || LINEAR || — || align=right | 3.2 km || 
|-id=968 bgcolor=#fefefe
| 116968 ||  || — || April 19, 2004 || Socorro || LINEAR || NYS || align=right | 1.5 km || 
|-id=969 bgcolor=#C2FFFF
| 116969 ||  || — || April 19, 2004 || Socorro || LINEAR || L4 || align=right | 21 km || 
|-id=970 bgcolor=#C2FFFF
| 116970 ||  || — || April 16, 2004 || Kitt Peak || Spacewatch || L4 || align=right | 11 km || 
|-id=971 bgcolor=#E9E9E9
| 116971 ||  || — || April 17, 2004 || Socorro || LINEAR || — || align=right | 3.2 km || 
|-id=972 bgcolor=#d6d6d6
| 116972 ||  || — || April 16, 2004 || Socorro || LINEAR || THM || align=right | 4.1 km || 
|-id=973 bgcolor=#fefefe
| 116973 ||  || — || April 17, 2004 || Socorro || LINEAR || FLO || align=right | 1.1 km || 
|-id=974 bgcolor=#E9E9E9
| 116974 ||  || — || April 17, 2004 || Palomar || NEAT || MRX || align=right | 1.9 km || 
|-id=975 bgcolor=#d6d6d6
| 116975 ||  || — || April 19, 2004 || Socorro || LINEAR || THM || align=right | 4.8 km || 
|-id=976 bgcolor=#E9E9E9
| 116976 ||  || — || April 19, 2004 || Socorro || LINEAR || — || align=right | 6.0 km || 
|-id=977 bgcolor=#fefefe
| 116977 ||  || — || April 20, 2004 || Socorro || LINEAR || V || align=right | 1.2 km || 
|-id=978 bgcolor=#E9E9E9
| 116978 ||  || — || April 20, 2004 || Socorro || LINEAR || HOF || align=right | 5.9 km || 
|-id=979 bgcolor=#E9E9E9
| 116979 ||  || — || April 20, 2004 || Socorro || LINEAR || — || align=right | 4.3 km || 
|-id=980 bgcolor=#d6d6d6
| 116980 ||  || — || April 21, 2004 || Kitt Peak || Spacewatch || KOR || align=right | 2.1 km || 
|-id=981 bgcolor=#d6d6d6
| 116981 ||  || — || April 21, 2004 || Socorro || LINEAR || EOS || align=right | 3.3 km || 
|-id=982 bgcolor=#d6d6d6
| 116982 ||  || — || April 17, 2004 || Socorro || LINEAR || BRA || align=right | 3.1 km || 
|-id=983 bgcolor=#fefefe
| 116983 ||  || — || April 16, 2004 || Socorro || LINEAR || — || align=right | 1.9 km || 
|-id=984 bgcolor=#d6d6d6
| 116984 ||  || — || April 16, 2004 || Socorro || LINEAR || VER || align=right | 5.8 km || 
|-id=985 bgcolor=#E9E9E9
| 116985 ||  || — || April 16, 2004 || Socorro || LINEAR || — || align=right | 3.2 km || 
|-id=986 bgcolor=#E9E9E9
| 116986 ||  || — || April 16, 2004 || Palomar || NEAT || — || align=right | 1.9 km || 
|-id=987 bgcolor=#E9E9E9
| 116987 ||  || — || April 16, 2004 || Palomar || NEAT || — || align=right | 3.0 km || 
|-id=988 bgcolor=#E9E9E9
| 116988 ||  || — || April 17, 2004 || Socorro || LINEAR || RAF || align=right | 3.1 km || 
|-id=989 bgcolor=#d6d6d6
| 116989 ||  || — || April 20, 2004 || Socorro || LINEAR || — || align=right | 6.4 km || 
|-id=990 bgcolor=#E9E9E9
| 116990 ||  || — || April 21, 2004 || Socorro || LINEAR || — || align=right | 5.5 km || 
|-id=991 bgcolor=#d6d6d6
| 116991 ||  || — || April 21, 2004 || Socorro || LINEAR || LIX || align=right | 8.2 km || 
|-id=992 bgcolor=#d6d6d6
| 116992 ||  || — || April 21, 2004 || Socorro || LINEAR || EOS || align=right | 3.8 km || 
|-id=993 bgcolor=#d6d6d6
| 116993 ||  || — || April 21, 2004 || Siding Spring || SSS || EUP || align=right | 11 km || 
|-id=994 bgcolor=#d6d6d6
| 116994 ||  || — || April 22, 2004 || Socorro || LINEAR || HYG || align=right | 4.9 km || 
|-id=995 bgcolor=#d6d6d6
| 116995 ||  || — || April 22, 2004 || Catalina || CSS || TIR || align=right | 3.7 km || 
|-id=996 bgcolor=#E9E9E9
| 116996 ||  || — || April 22, 2004 || Siding Spring || SSS || — || align=right | 3.2 km || 
|-id=997 bgcolor=#fefefe
| 116997 ||  || — || April 23, 2004 || Socorro || LINEAR || — || align=right | 1.6 km || 
|-id=998 bgcolor=#d6d6d6
| 116998 ||  || — || April 23, 2004 || Haleakala || NEAT || — || align=right | 4.9 km || 
|-id=999 bgcolor=#E9E9E9
| 116999 ||  || — || April 25, 2004 || Socorro || LINEAR || RAF || align=right | 1.8 km || 
|-id=000 bgcolor=#d6d6d6
| 117000 ||  || — || April 21, 2004 || Socorro || LINEAR || — || align=right | 7.1 km || 
|}

References

External links 
 Discovery Circumstances: Numbered Minor Planets (115001)–(120000) (IAU Minor Planet Center)

0116